= Phandar =

Musical instrument

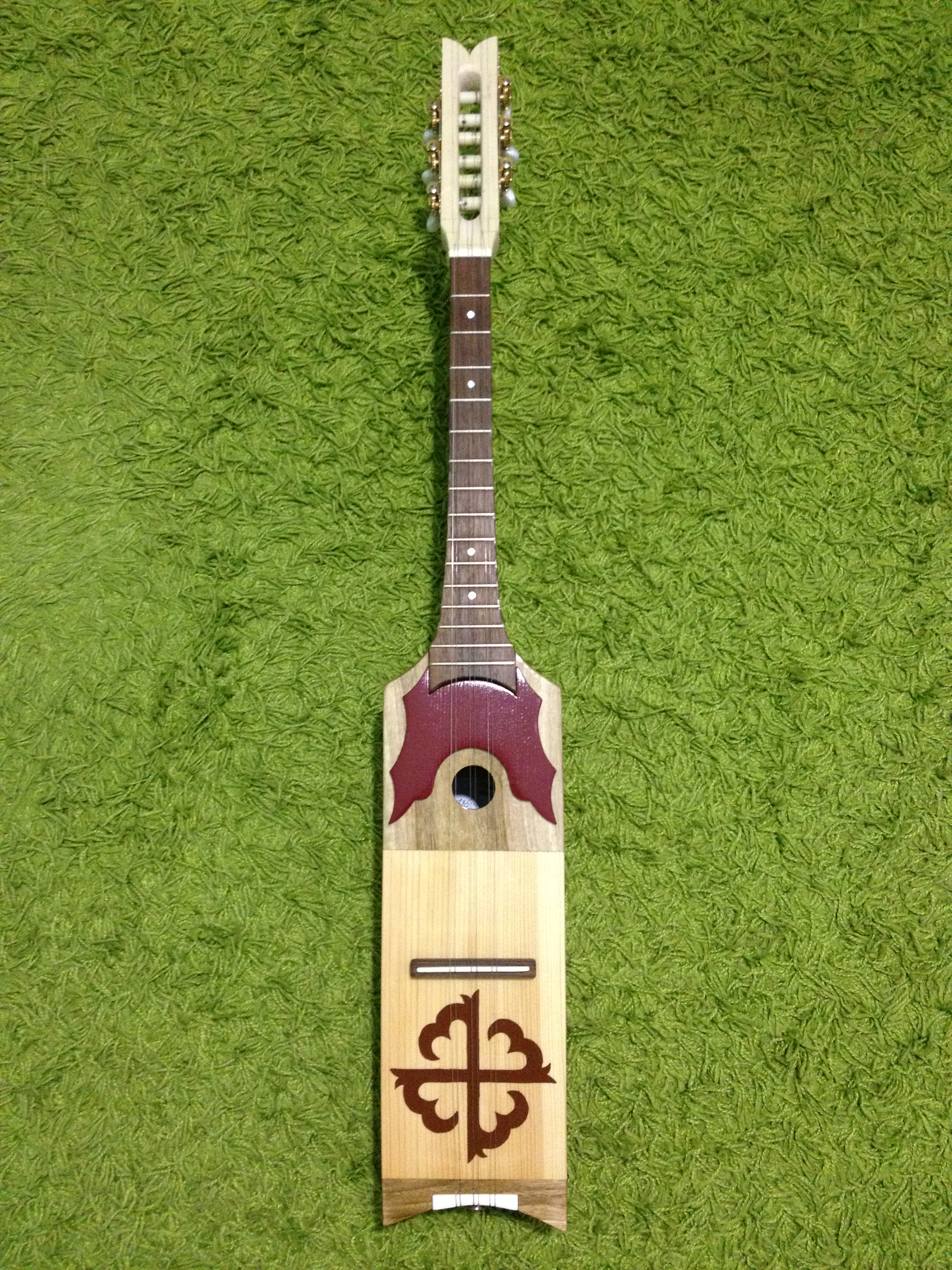

String instrument
- Classification: Plucked

Related instruments
- Panduri; Pandura; Tamur-Pandur; Dala-Fandyr; Chonguri; Dangubica; Samica; Tar (lute); Setar; Tamburica; Tambouras; Bouzouki (Greece); Buzuq (Lebanon); Tambura; Baglama; Baglamas; Šargija

The Phandar (Ingush: Пандар, /pɑːnˈdʌr/; Chechen: Пхıандар, /phɑːnˈdʌr/) is a traditional Vainakhish three-string plucked instrument from Chechnya and Ingushetia in the Northern Caucasus.

The sound produced by the Phandar is similar to the Panduri, but it is easy to hear the difference between these two similar instruments.

== Vainakhish Phandar ==
Phandar is the most popular and commonly used string folk instrument in Chechnya and Ingushetia.

== Construction ==
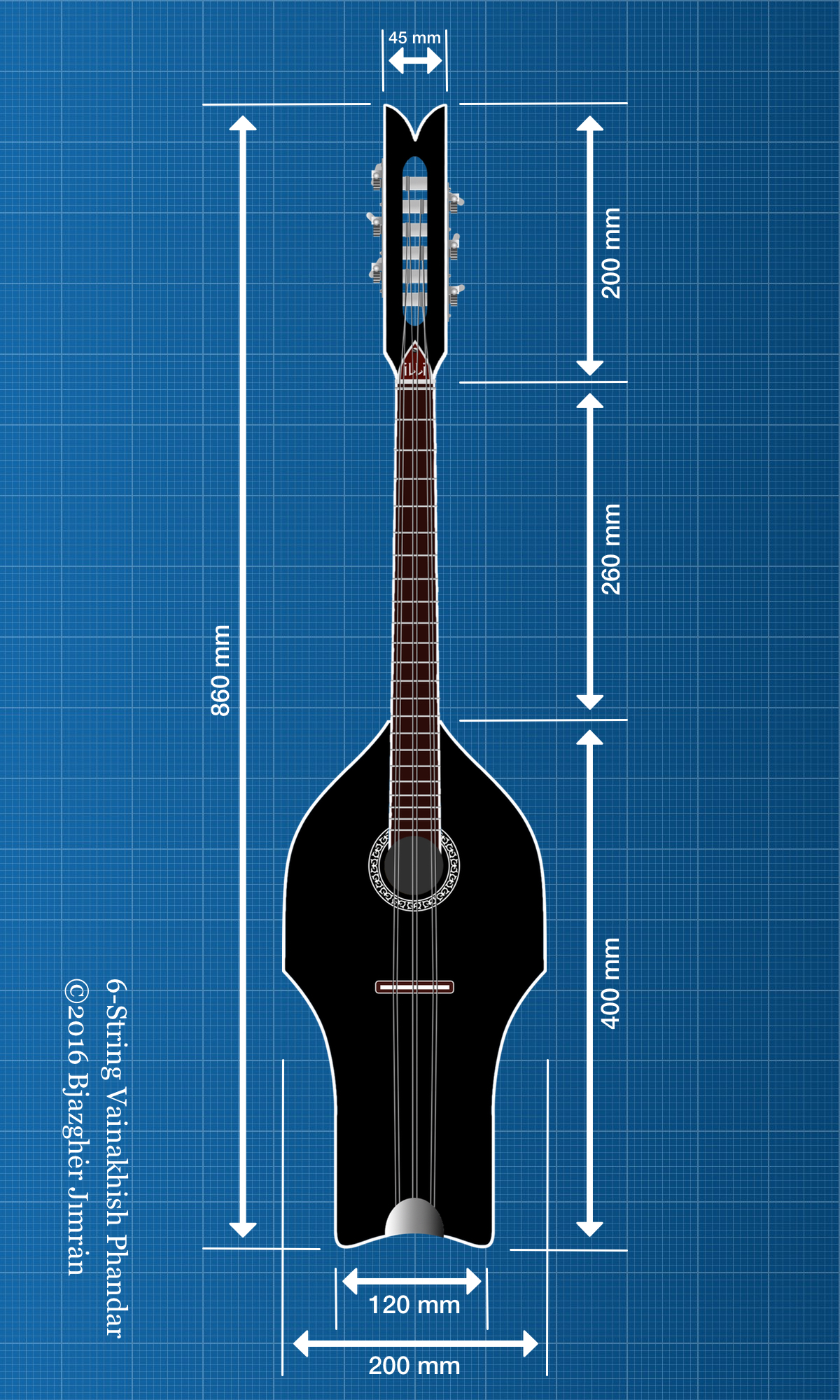
Reconstruction of six-string Phandar from Bazajev V. I.

Phandars have a wooden elongated body, carved from one piece of wood, with a flat top and a curved lower deck. They are traditionally made of walnut wood.

Traditional phandar's frets were made of cord or gut string, but modern versions can be made using the same plastic or steel frets used for guitars and other modern fretted instruments.

Phandar are customarily 750–900 mm long, end-to-end, but can vary in size depending on the maker. Originally phanders had 3 separate strings, but some modern instruments have 6 strings in 3 double-courses. Modern phandars are strung with steel strings, but other materials, such as gut strings, may have been used in the past. Three string phandars are tuned c–d–g′, and double-strung phanders are tuned cc–dd–gg′.

== Tuning ==
- Three-stringed Phondar: c–d–g'
- Six-stringed Phondar: cc–dd–gg'

== Related instruments ==
Related or similar instruments in other Caucasian countries:
Georgia - Panduri
Ossetia - Dala-Fandyr
Dagestan - Tamur-Pandur
Adygea - Apa-Pshina

== See also ==
- Pandura
- Panduri
- Baglamas
- Bouzouki
- Dombra
- Dutar
