= Panduri =

Georgian stringed instrument

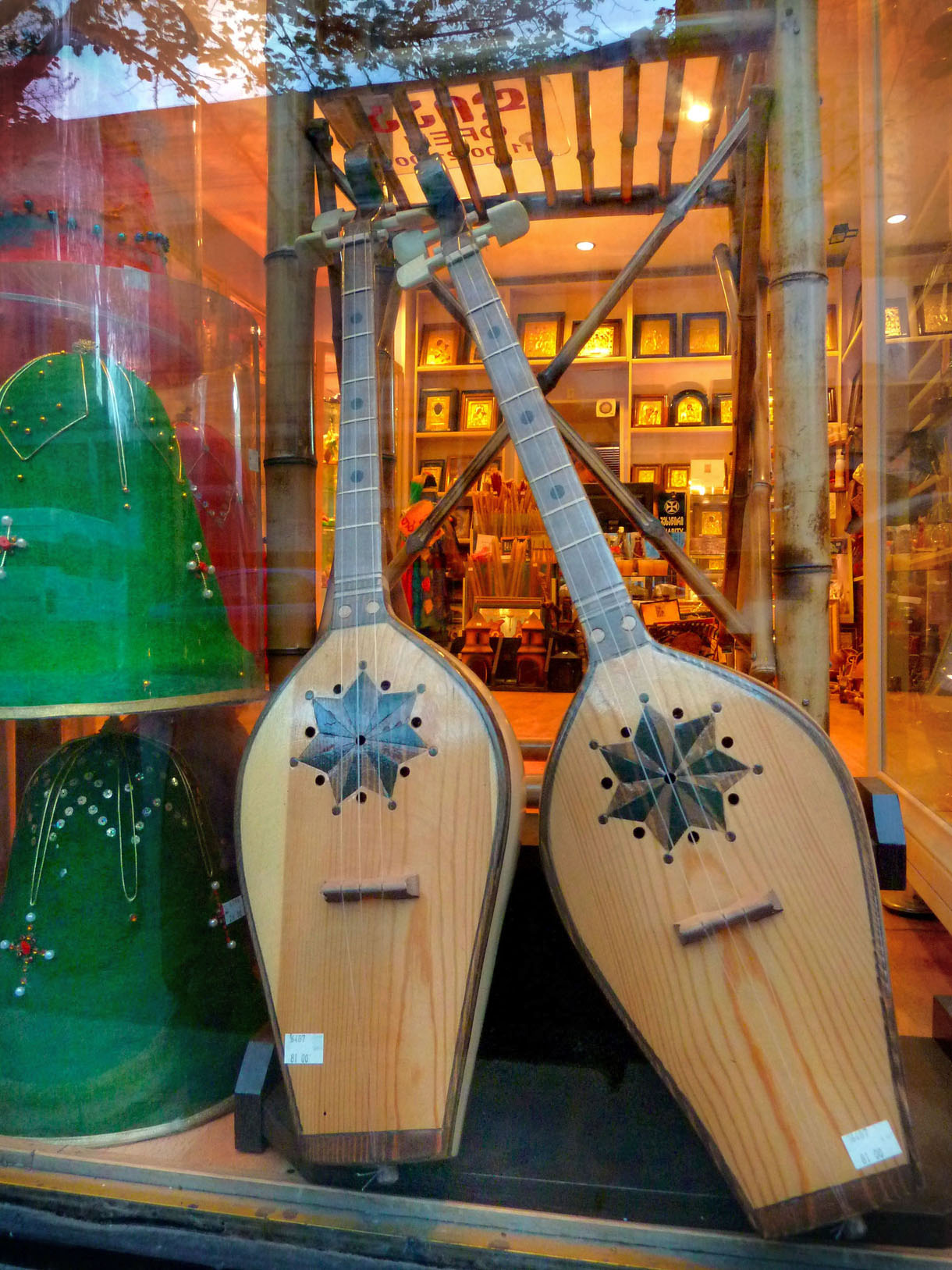

String instrument
- Classification: Plucked string instrument

Related instruments
- Panduri; Pandura; Phandar; Chonguri; Dangubica; Samica; Tar (lute); Setar; Tamburica; Tambouras; Bouzouki (Greece); Buzuq (Lebanon); Tambura; Baglama; Baglamas; Šargija

The panduri (Georgian: ფანდური) is a traditional Georgian three-string plucked instrument common in all regions of Eastern Georgia: such as Pshav-Khevsureti, Tusheti, Kakheti and Kartli.

The panduri is generally used to accompany solo heroic, comic and love songs, as well as dance.

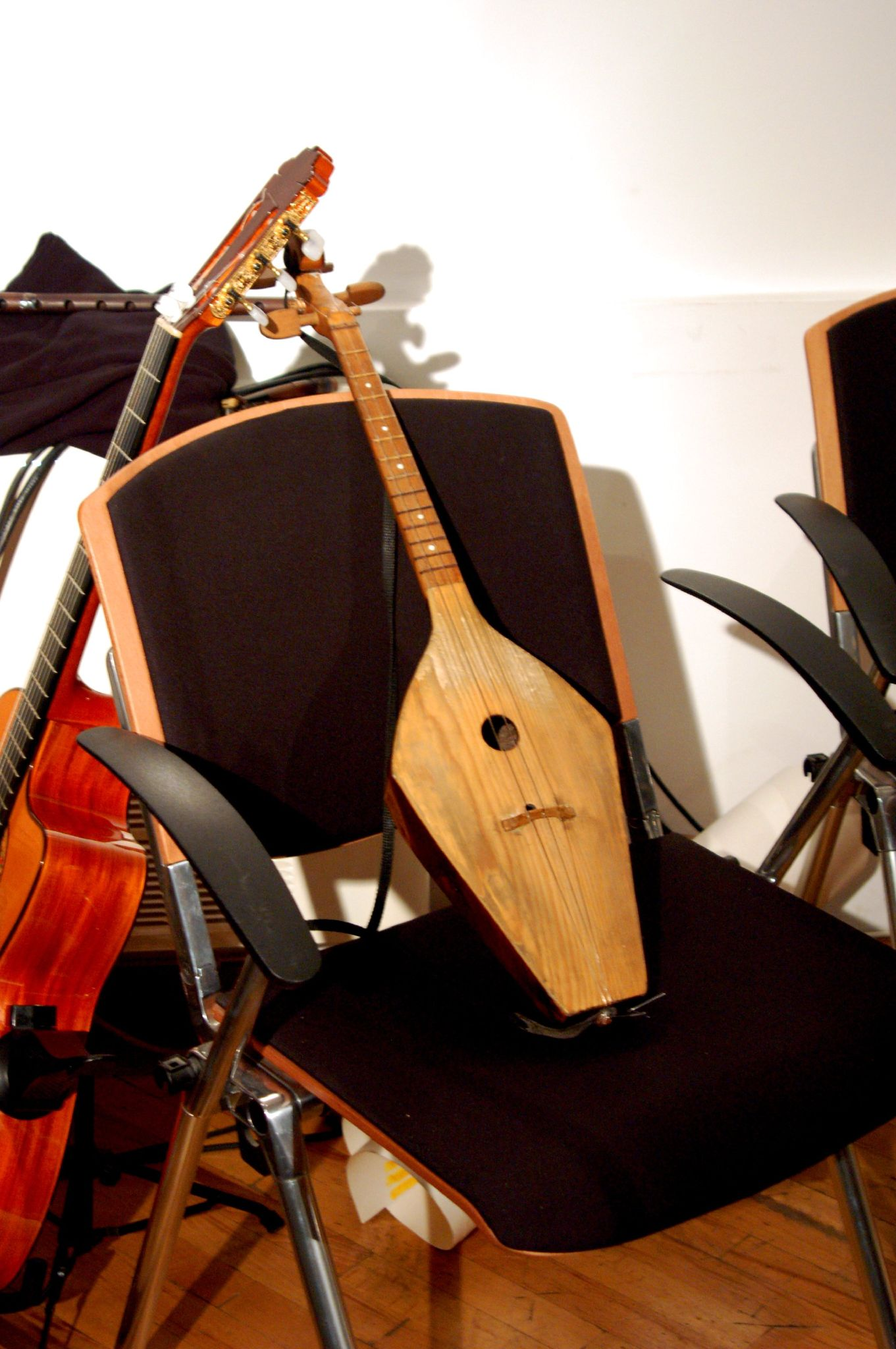
Panduri from front.

== Tuning ==
- Three-stringed panduri: G-A-C or E-B-A or A-C#-E
- Two-stringed panduri: D-C#

== Construction ==
The frets on the panduri are traditionally made of wood inlaid in the fingerboard, usually seven frets to an octave, but nowadays chromatic fretting with metal frets can also be found.

The body of the panduri is usually made more in the shape of a spade, less often with a parallel sided endblock. It is traditionally carved from a single block of wood, but a staved construction (like a lute) is also common.

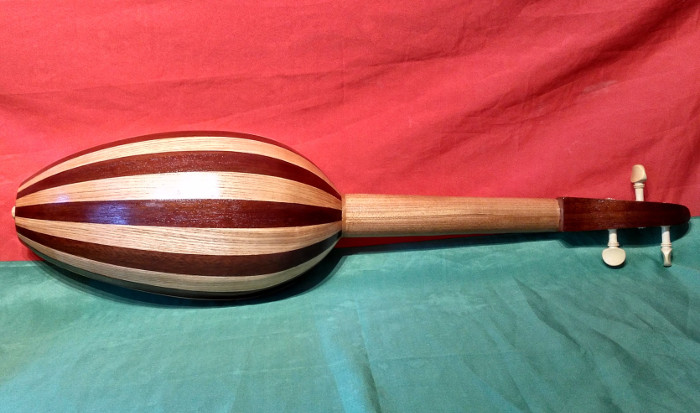
Back view of panduri with body made of ribs

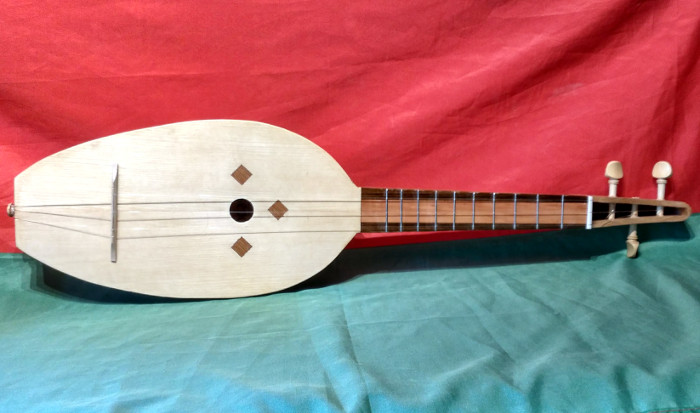
Front view of panduri with body made of ribs

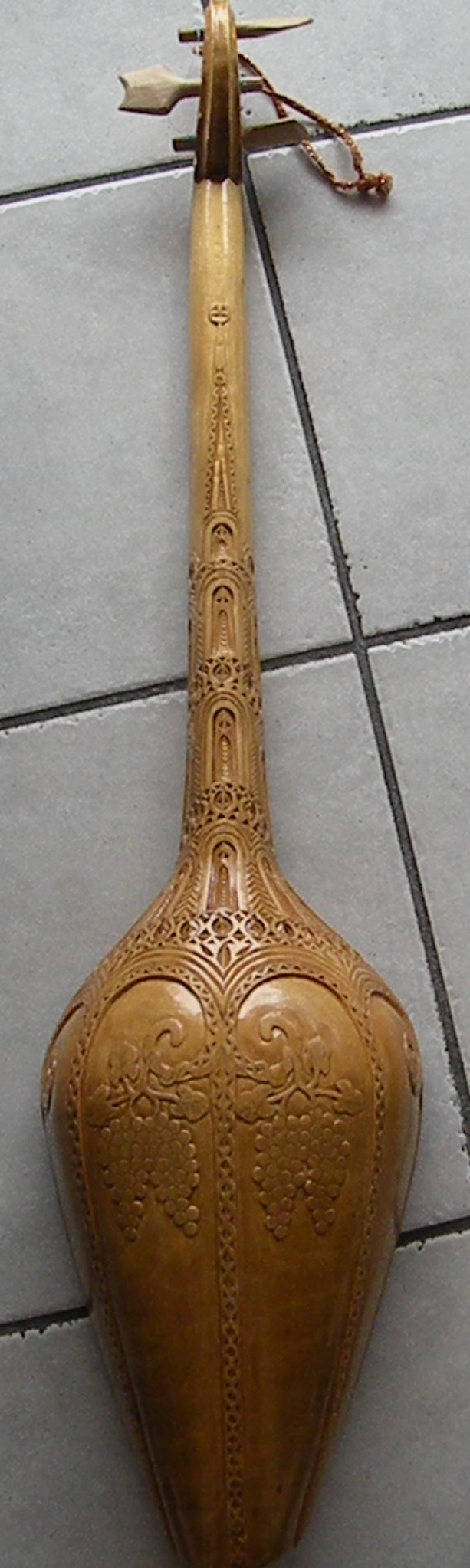
Georgian panduri (carved version) from back

== Variants and related instruments ==
The panduri is a three-stringed lute from the highland and lowland regions of eastern Georgia, usually played by strumming, and often for choral and rhythmic support of vocal melody.

There are two kinds of panduri in Georgia: one is the traditional "folk" panduri, which typically has seven frets and more closely approximates the scale divisions in the non-Western Georgian scale system. The second kind is the "chromatic" panduri, which has the same tonal divisions as a guitar and is capable of reproducing all the half-steps of the tempered Western scale. It is also sometimes found in Western Georgia (Upper Imereti and Racha). The two-stringed panduri survives in Khevsureti.

Sometimes the panduri is also mistakenly called a "chonguri" - but the chonguri is a completely different instrument which comes from western Georgia; it is fretless, and it has a fourth, half-length drone string. Additionally, the chonguri is an instrument mainly played by women, while the panduri is usually played by men.

A similar instrument is found in Chechnya, where it is known as: phandar, pondar, ponder, pandir, pandur, dechig pondur, adkhoku pondur, dakhch pandr, or merz ponder.

== See also ==
- Phandar
- Chonguri
- Pandura
