= Cura (instrument) =

Turkish musical instrument

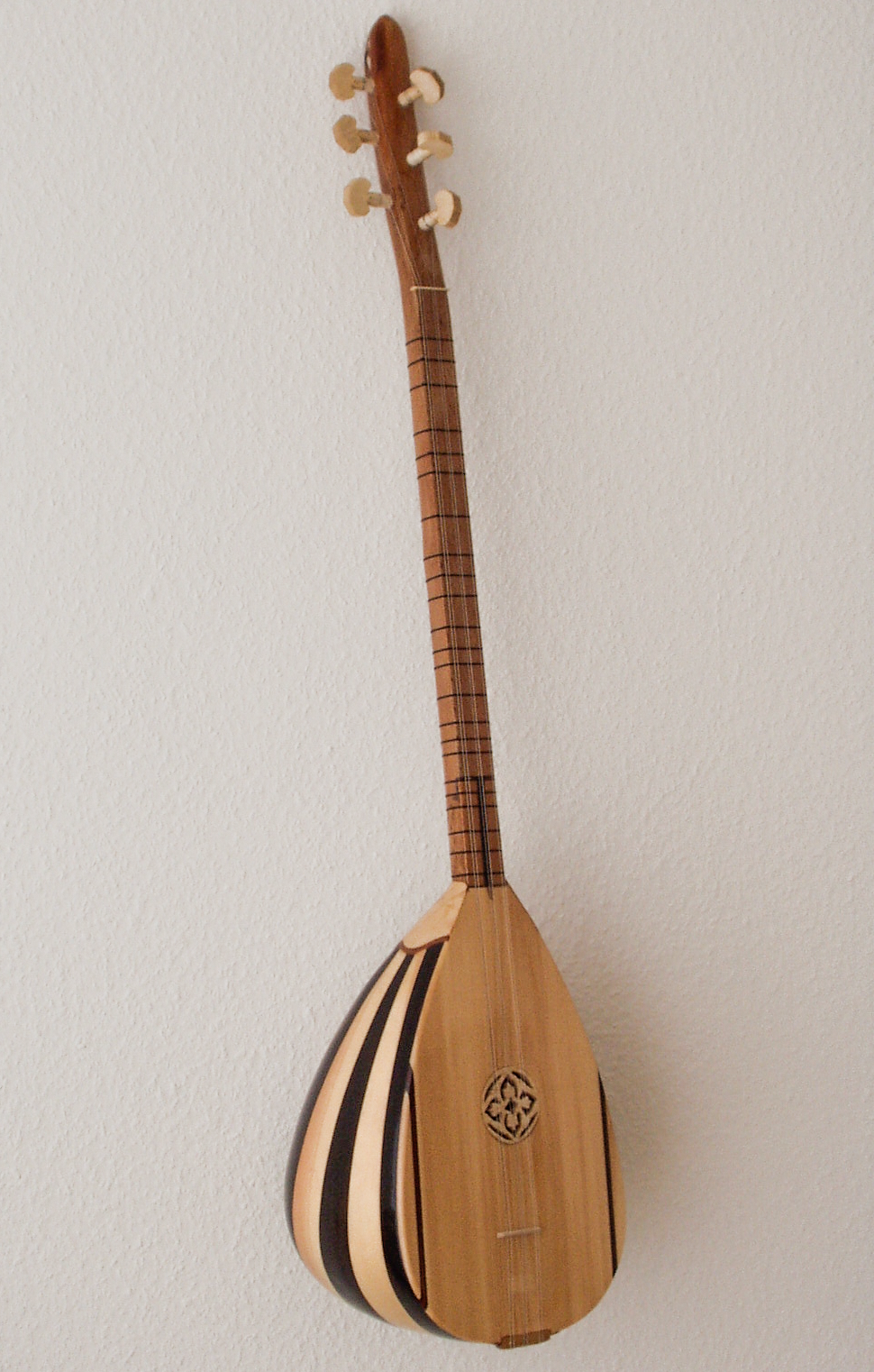
- Classification: Plucked string instruments
- Hornbostel–Sachs classification: 321.321

Related instruments
- Tzouras; Bağlama; Baglamas (Greece); Bouzouki (Greece); Tambouras (Greece); Buzuq (Lebanon) and (Syria); Tanbur; Tar (lute), dutar, and setar (Iran)

The cura (Turkish pronunciation: [dʒuˈɾa]) is a Turkish plucked string folk instrument. It is the smallest and highest pitched member of the bağlama family of instruments. It is found in nearly every region of the country with varying exact dimensions, tunings, playing techniques, and names including dede sazı, parmak cura, üç telli cura, bağlama curası, and tanbura curası. The two other members of the bağlama family are the larger tambura and the largest divan sazı, which are one and two octaves lower than the cura, respectively.

The instrument has three main parts, the bowl (tekne), the sound board (göğüs), and the neck (sap). The bowl is made from mulberry wood, juniper, beech, spruce, or walnut, the sound board made of spruce, and the neck is made of beech or juniper. The tuning pegs (burgu literally screw). Frets are tied to the neck with fishing line, which allows them to be adjusted. The cura is usually played with a mızrap or tezene, a plectrum made from cherrywood bark or plastic, but in some regions, it is played with the fingers in a style known as şelpe or şerpe.

The two-stringed Kozağaç cura, known as simply “two-stringed” in the Teke region, varies in terms of structural and instrumental features.

== See also ==
- Tzouras
