= Tambouras =

Greek traditional string instrument

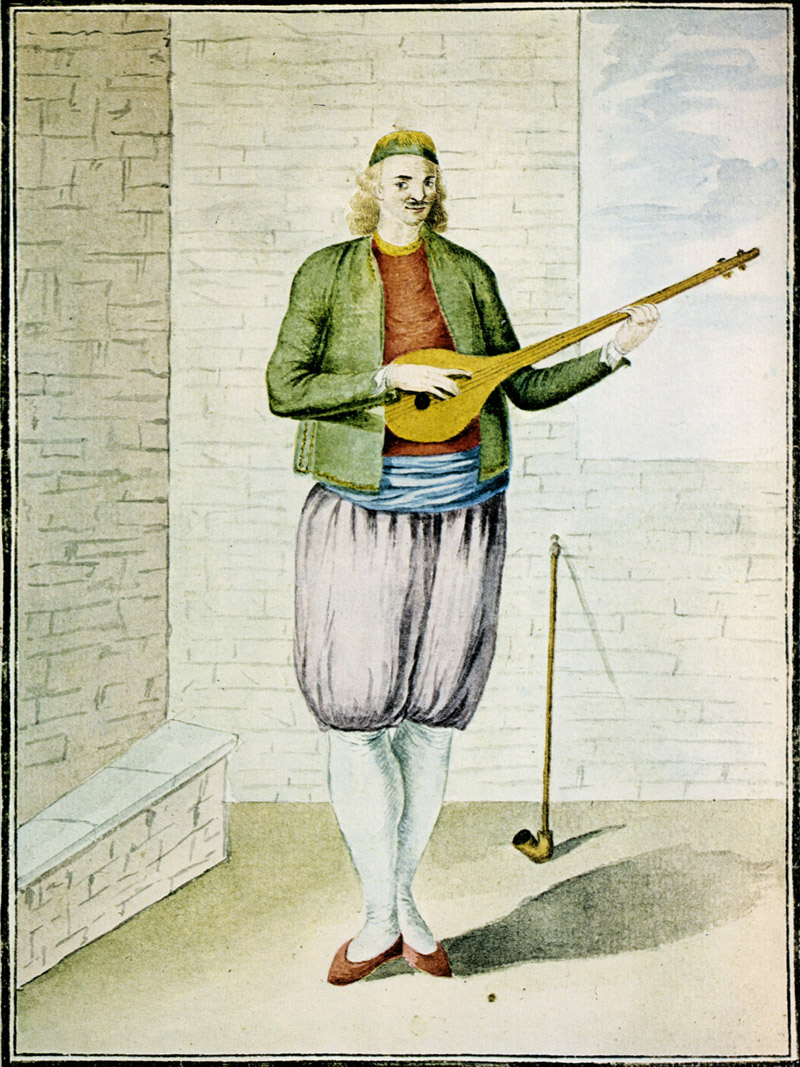
- Greek playing tambouras, 18th-century painting

String
- Classification: Plucked

Related instruments
- Bağlama (Turkey); Baglamas (Greece); Bouzouki (Greece); Buzuq (Lebanon); Chonguri; Dangubica; Pandura; Panduri; Samica; Šargija; Setar; Tambura; Tamburica; Tar (lute)

The tambouras (Greek: ταμπουράς [tabuˈras]) is a Greek traditional string instrument of Byzantine origin. It has existed since at least the 10th century, when it was known in Assyria and Egypt. At that time, it might have had between two and six strings. The characteristic long neck bears two strings, tuned five notes apart.

It is also similar to the Turkish tambur and Indian tanpura.

Tanbur, a Persian word, is according to some scholars derived from the Sumerian pan tur, meaning "little bow".

== History ==
=== Origins ===
It is considered that the tambouras' ancestor is the ancient Greek pandouris, also known as pandoura, pandouros or pandourida (πανδουρίς, πανδούρα, πάνδουρος), from which the word is derived. The tambouras is mentioned in the Byzantine epic of Digenis Akritas, when the hero plays his θαμπούριν, thambourin (medieval form of tambouras):

Και αφότου αποδείπνησεν, εμπαίνει εις το κουβούκλιν

και επήρεν το θαμπούριν του και αποκατάστησέν το.

When he had finished his meal, he entered his chamber

and picked up his tamboura [thambourin] and tuned it.

— Digenis Akritis, Escorial version, vv. 826–827, ed. and transl. Elizabeth Jeffreys

=== Name ===
The name resembles that of the Indian tanpura, but the Greek tambouras is a completely different instrument. Since modern Greek words do not have a standard transliteration into the Latin alphabet, the word may be found written in many ways: tampouras, tambouras, tabouras, taburas etc. Even the final -s may be dropped at the transliteration, since it marks the masculine nominative in Greek. Variations of the word are to be found in Greece: tsambouras, tambouri.

The word ταμπουράς comes from Turkish tambur from Arabic ṭanbūr or Persian tunbūra.

=== Type ===
The tambouras is a long-neck fretted instrument of the lute family, close to Turkish saz and the Persian tanbur. It has movable frets that permit playing tunes in the Greek traditional modes (equivalent of the makams of Arabic music and the ichoi of Byzantine music). It was also known as Pandouris, Pandoura and Fandouros in the Byzantine Empire. When the tambouras was tempered, it gave rise to the bouzouki, which is, in fact, a recent development of the tambouras.

== Gallery ==
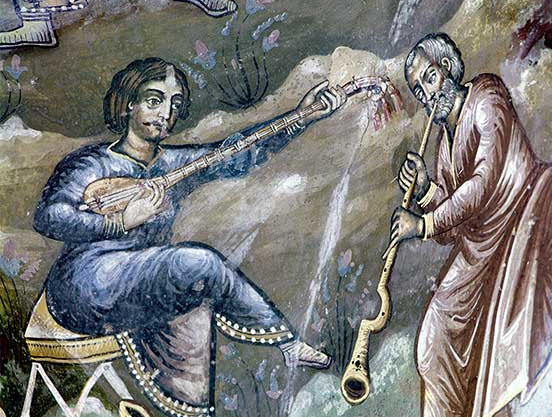
11th century A.D., Byzantium. Tambouras and fingerhole trumpet.

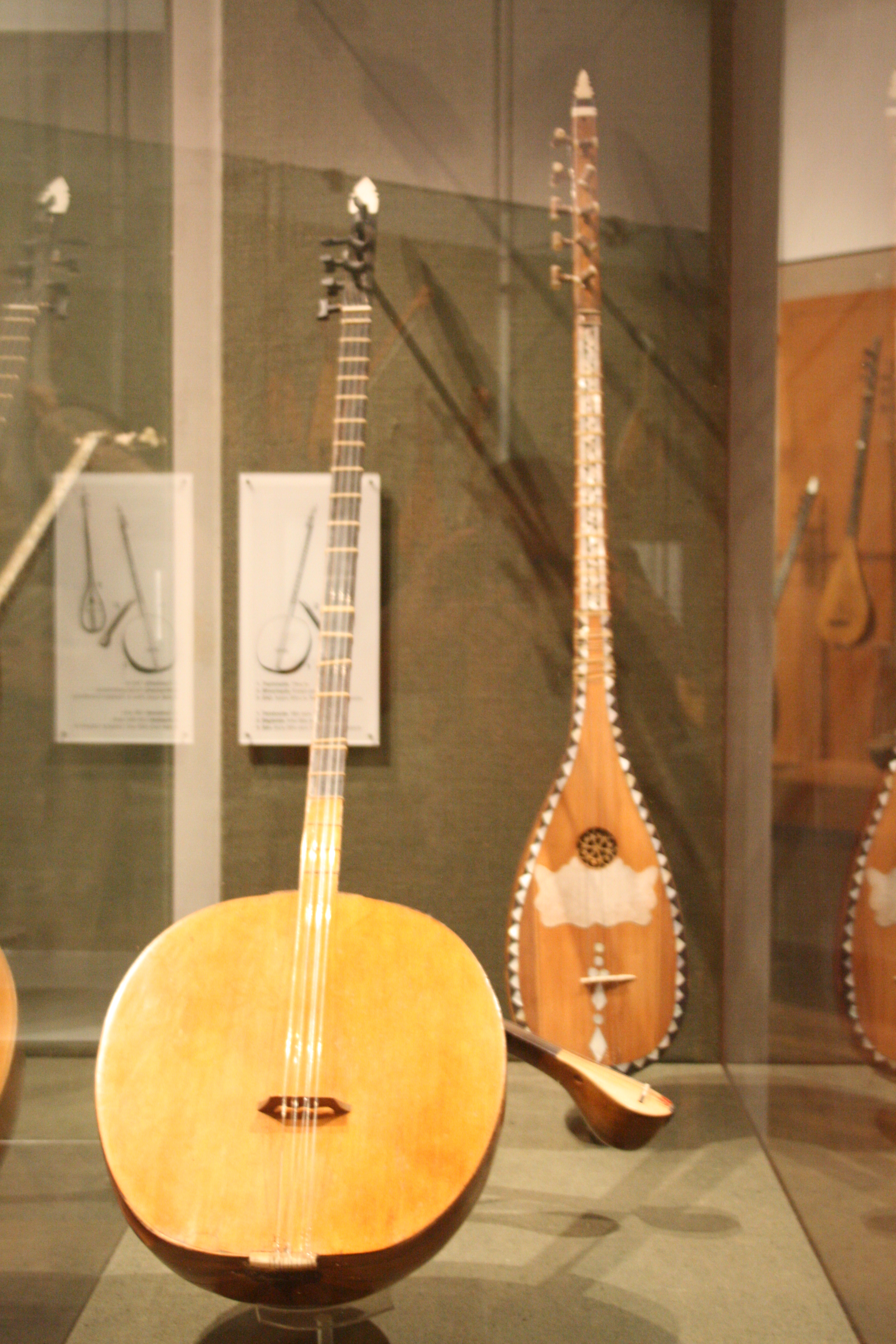
Display of Greek tamboura at the right (the inst. left is a tambur).

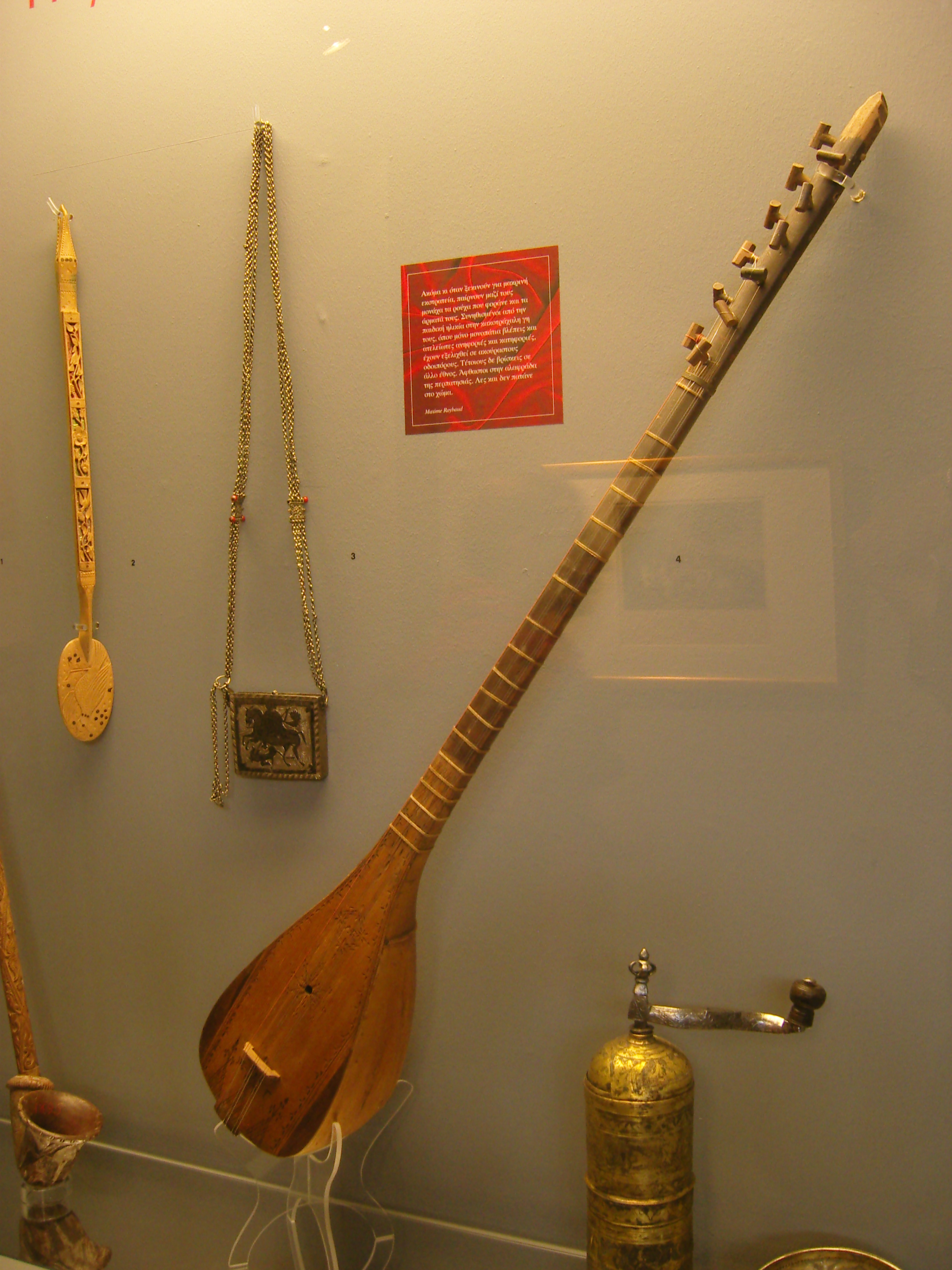

== See also ==
- Tambura
- Tamburica
