= Buzuk =

Buzuk may refer to:

- Buzuk, the Albanian word for Bouzouki, a chordophone used in folk music
- Andrija Buzuk, 1891–1894, provincial superior of the Franciscan province Bosna Argentina

== See also ==
- Buzuq
