= Pandura =

Ancient string instrument

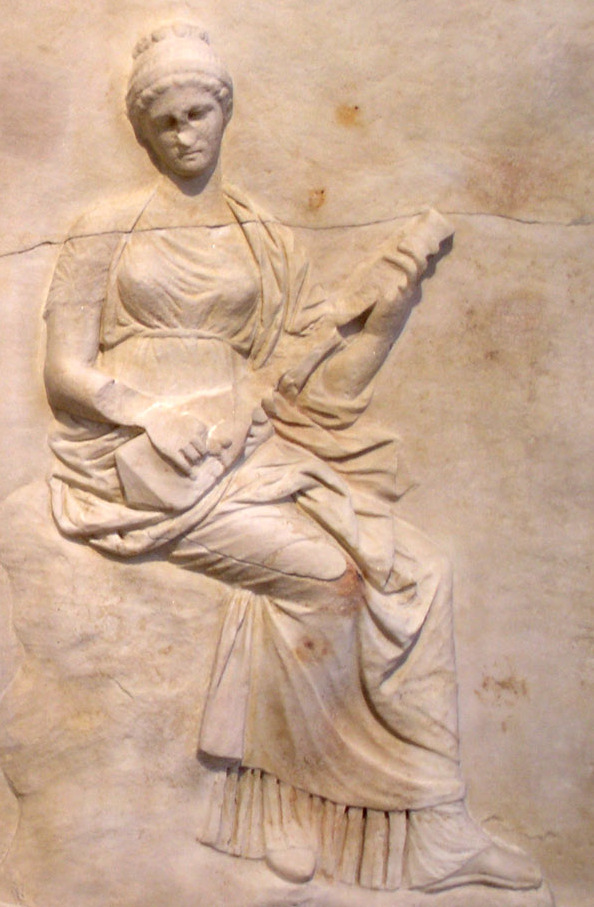
- Muse playing a pandoura, detail of a bas relief from Mantineia, 4th century BC (NAMA)
- Classification: Necked lutes; String instruments

Related instruments
- Angélique (instrument); Archlute; Barbat (lute); Bağlama (Saz); Baglamas; Bouzouki; Byzantine Lyra; Charango; Chitarra Italiana; Dombra; Domra; Dutar; Lute; Mandolin; Oud; Pandura; Panduri; Phandar; Tambura; Tambouras; Tanbur; Tanbur (Turkish); Tembûr; Theorbo; Tiorbino

The pandura (Ancient Greek: πανδοῦρα, pandoura) or pandore, an ancient Greek string instrument, belonged in the broad class of the lute and guitar instruments. Akkadians played similar instruments from the 3rd millennium BC. Ancient Greek artwork depicts such lutes from the 3rd or 4th century BC onward.

== Ancient Greece ==
The ancient Greek pandoura was a medium or long-necked lute with a small sound box, used by the ancient Greeks. It commonly had three strings: such an instrument was also known as the trichordon (three-stringed) (τρίχορδον, McKinnon 1984:10).

Its descendants still exist as the Kartvelian panduri, the Greek tambouras and bouzouki, the North African kuitra, the Eastern Mediterranean saz and the Balkan tamburica. They remained popular also in the near east and eastern Europe. Since the fourth century BC, over time, they usually acquiring a third string.

Renato Meucci (1996) suggests that the some Italian Renaissance descendants of pandura type were called chitarra italiana, mandore or mandola.

=== Origins of the name pandura ===
The name dates back to the origins of stringed instruments, when the archery-bow had a resonator added (becoming a musical bow) and was straightened to become a lute.

In Sumerian, a "bow" (as in bow and arrow or musical bow) or arched harp was giš.ban. When the adjective "tur" (small) was added it became gišban.tur and denoted the "musical instrument smaller than the hunting-bow." That would also "differentiate it from larger musical instruments."

Ban.tur became the "small bow". When the bow was straightened out (turning it into a lute) the instrument created "may have kept the name", ban.tur. That instrument "eventually led to the pandura.

Similarly, while not necessarily the first lute, it is possible that the term Ban.tur is also the origin of the name of several other lutes, such as tambur or tanbur.

== Roman ==
Information about Roman pandura-type instruments comes mainly from ancient Roman artwork. Under the Romans the pandura was modified: the long neck was preserved but was made wider to take four strings, and the body was either oval or slightly broader at the base, but without the inward curves of the pear-shaped instruments.

== Mesopotamia ==
Lute-class instruments were present in Mesopotamia since the Akkadian era, or the third millennium BC.

== Eastern variations ==
There were at least two distinct varieties of pandura.

One type was pear-shaped, used in Assyria and Persia. In this type the body had graceful inward curves which led up gradually from base to neck. These curves changed at the bottom end off the instrument to a more sloping outline, an elongated triangle with the corners rounded off.

The oval type, a favourite instrument of the Egyptians, was also found in ancient Persia and among the Arabs of North Africa.

=== Caucasus ===
From the ancient Greek word pandoura, a comparable instrument is found in modern Chechnya and Ingushetia, where it is known as phandar. In Georgia the panduri is a three-string fretted instrument. The modern Georganian panduri instrument is in the tanbur class.

== Gallery ==
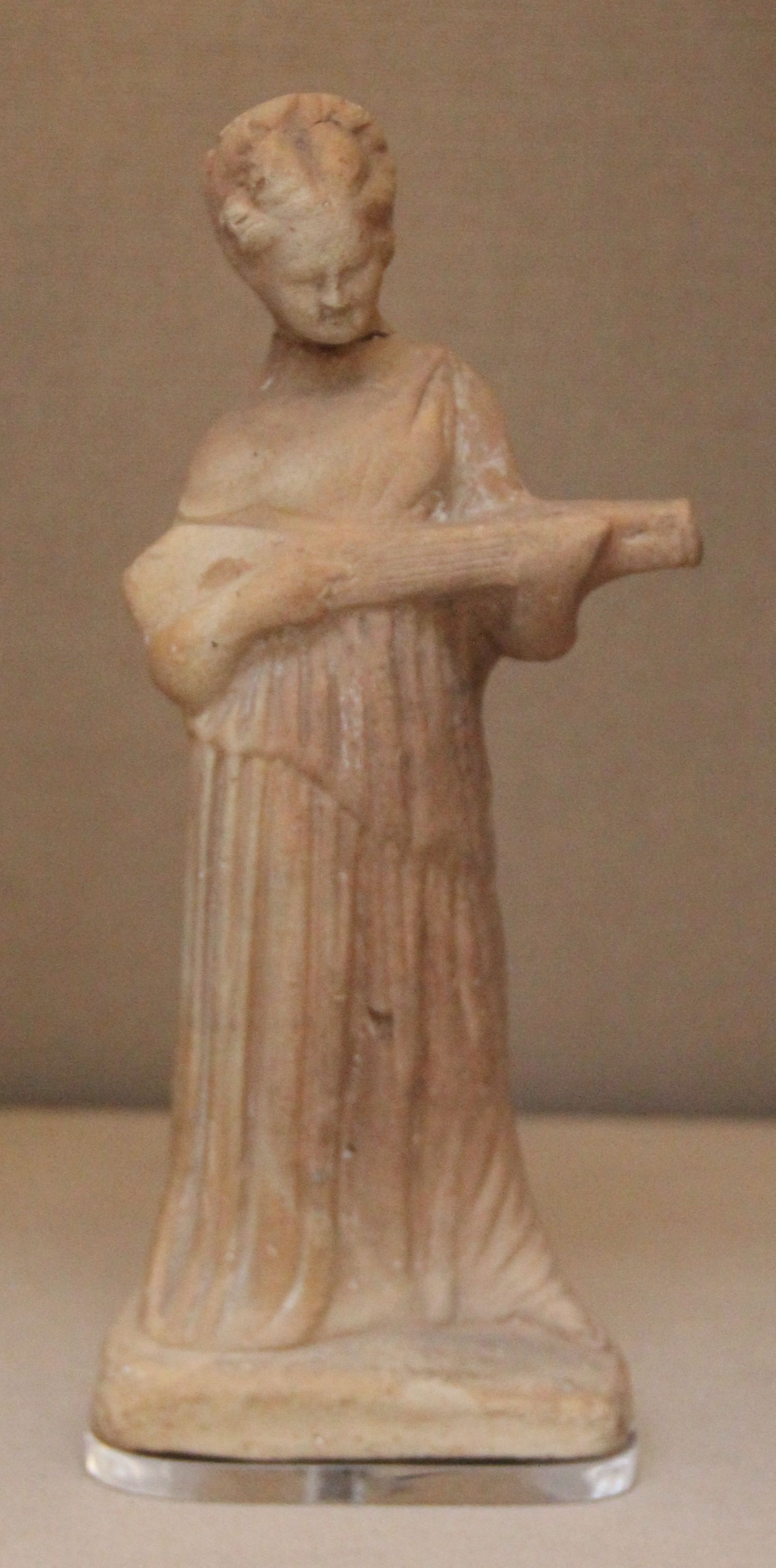
Terracotta figure of a woman playing a pandoura, ca. 300 BC, Cyprus (British Museum)

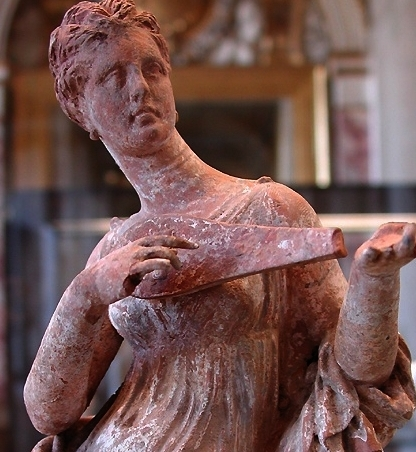
Ancient Greek Tanagra figurine, 200 BC.

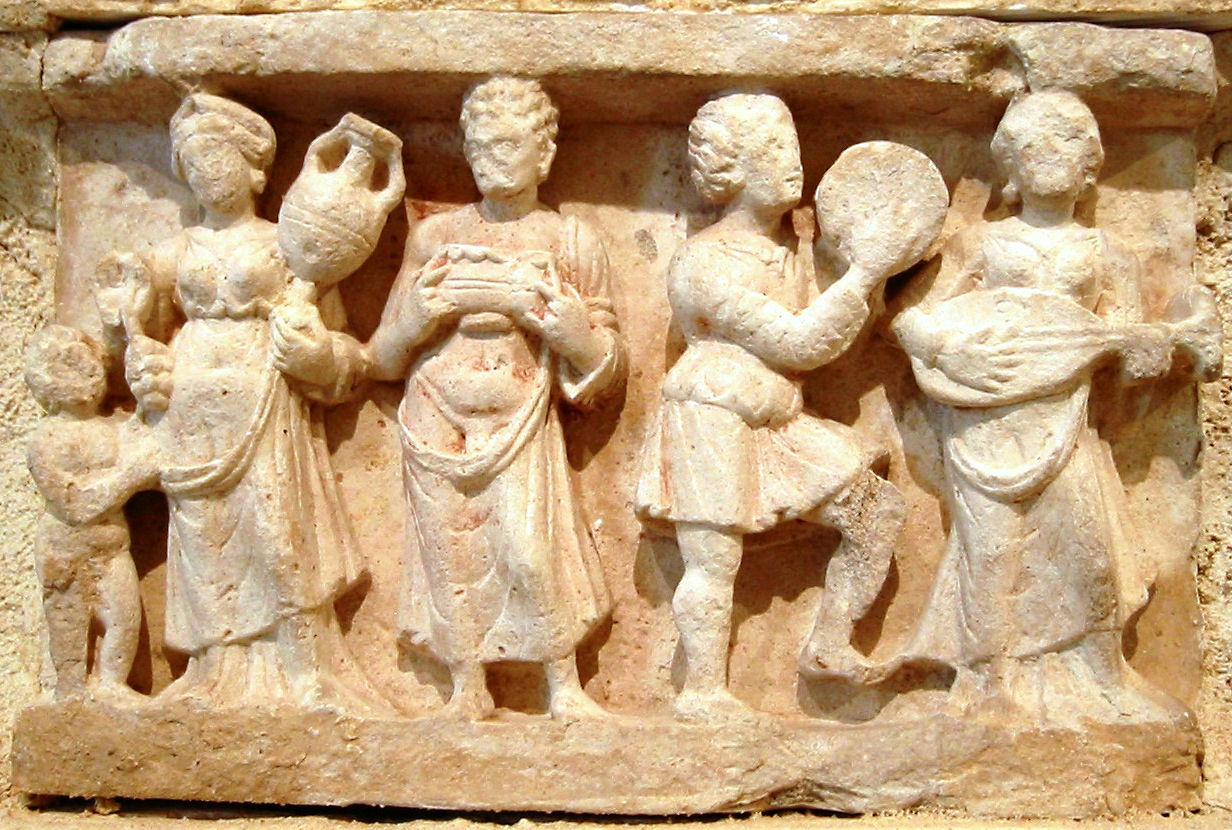
Short lute-family instrument on a Hellenistic-style plaster sculpture made in Hadda, Afghanistan and now at the Guimet Museum in Paris. Estimated date 1st-2nd century AD.

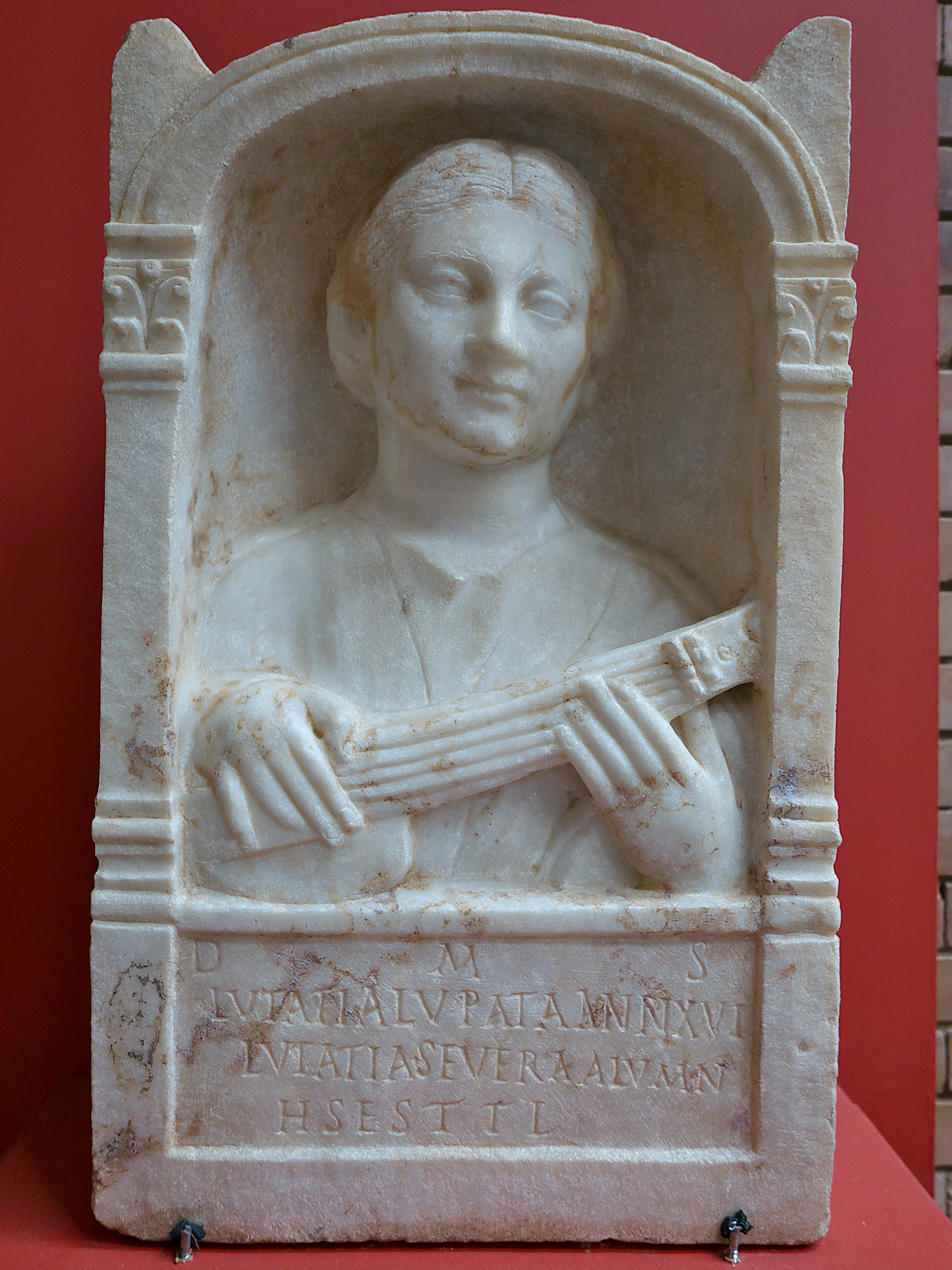
Memorial stele for a 16-year-old Roman woman, shown playing a pandurium, 2nd century AD, from Emerita Augusta, Hispania (Museo Nacional de Arte Romano, Mérida, Spain)

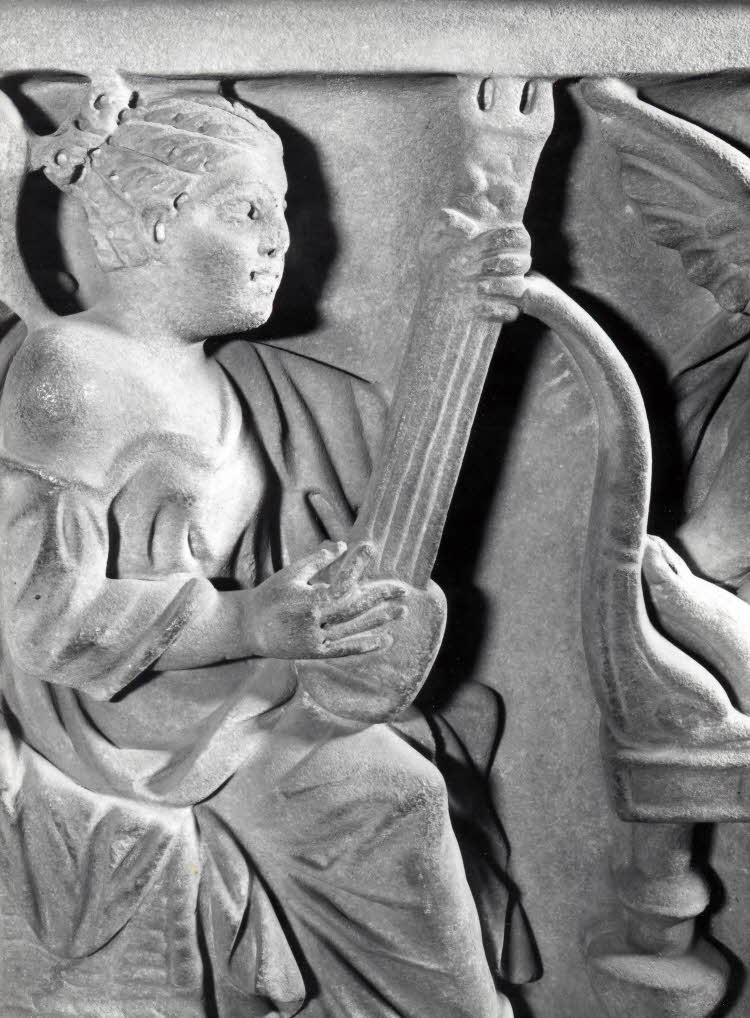
Detail of a pandura-type instrument from a Roman sarcophagus relief, 3rd century AD (British Museum)

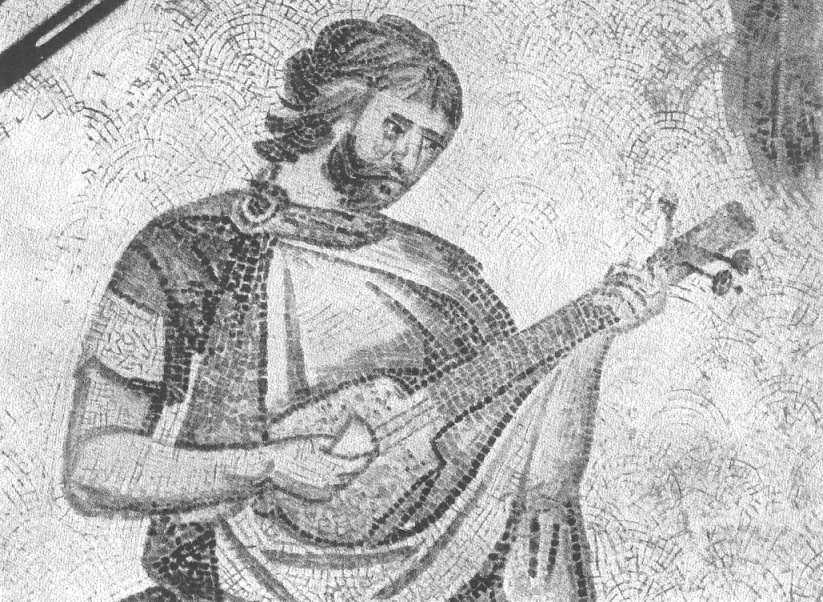
Roman or Byzantine pandoura from a 6th-century A.D. mosaic in the Great Palace of Constantinople. The instrument has three strings.

== See also ==
- Phandar
- Tambouras
- Panduri
- Baglamas
- Bandura
- Tanbur
- Mandolin
