= Šargija =

Balkan stringed instrument

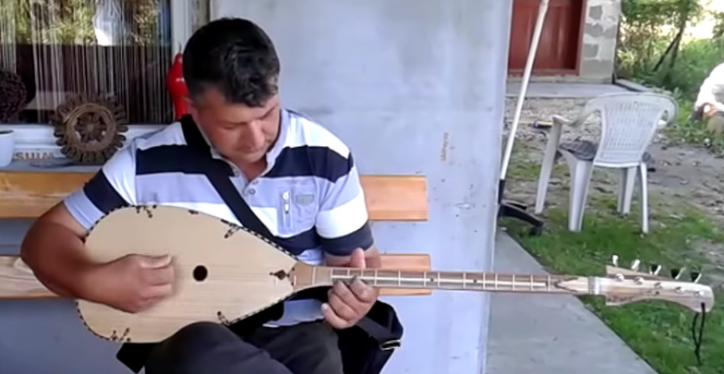
- Other names: Şarkiya
- Classification: Plucked string instruments

Related instruments
- Baglama; Baglamas; Tambura; Bouzouki (Greece); Buzuq (Lebanon); Çifteli; Choghur; Dangubica; Tamburica; Tambouras; Tembûr

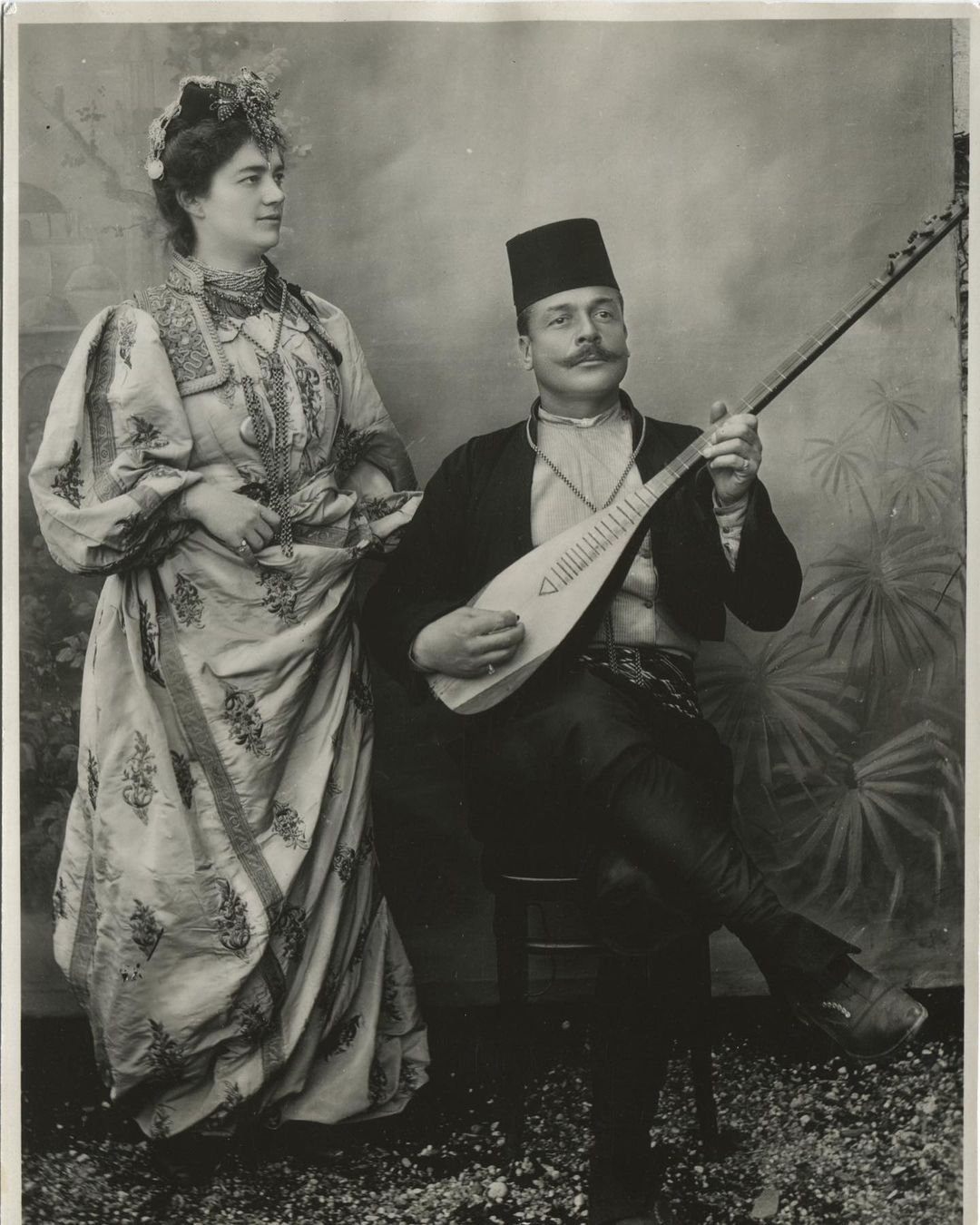
Bosniak from Sarajevo with a Šargija, 1906.

The šargija, şarkiya (Bosnian: šargija, Turkish: şarki or şarkiya, Albanian: sharki or sharkia), anglicized as shargia is a plucked, fretted long necked lute used in the folk music of various Balkan countries and Thrace including Bosnia and Herzegovina, Serbia, Albania, Kosovo, North Macedonia, Greece and Turkey. The instrument is part of a larger family of instruments which includes the tambura, balkan tambura, tamburica, tambouras, çöğür and the bağlama.

== History ==
The instrument was studied by musicologists in the 20th century. Their studies have been characterized as speculative and nationalistic.

More recently, an American researcher, Richard March, concluded that the tambura arrived in the Balkans with Turkish people in the 1500s. It was adopted by people living in the Balkans, including "urban Muslim Slavs" and "Bosnia Christians." It also arrived in Croatia with laborers.

Today the šargija is played by Albanians, Bosniaks, Serbs and Croats. The sharki is used by the Gheg Albanians in northern Albania, Kosovo, Serbia and parts of Montenegro and North Macedonia.

The Instrument accompanies singing and dancing.

== Characteristics ==
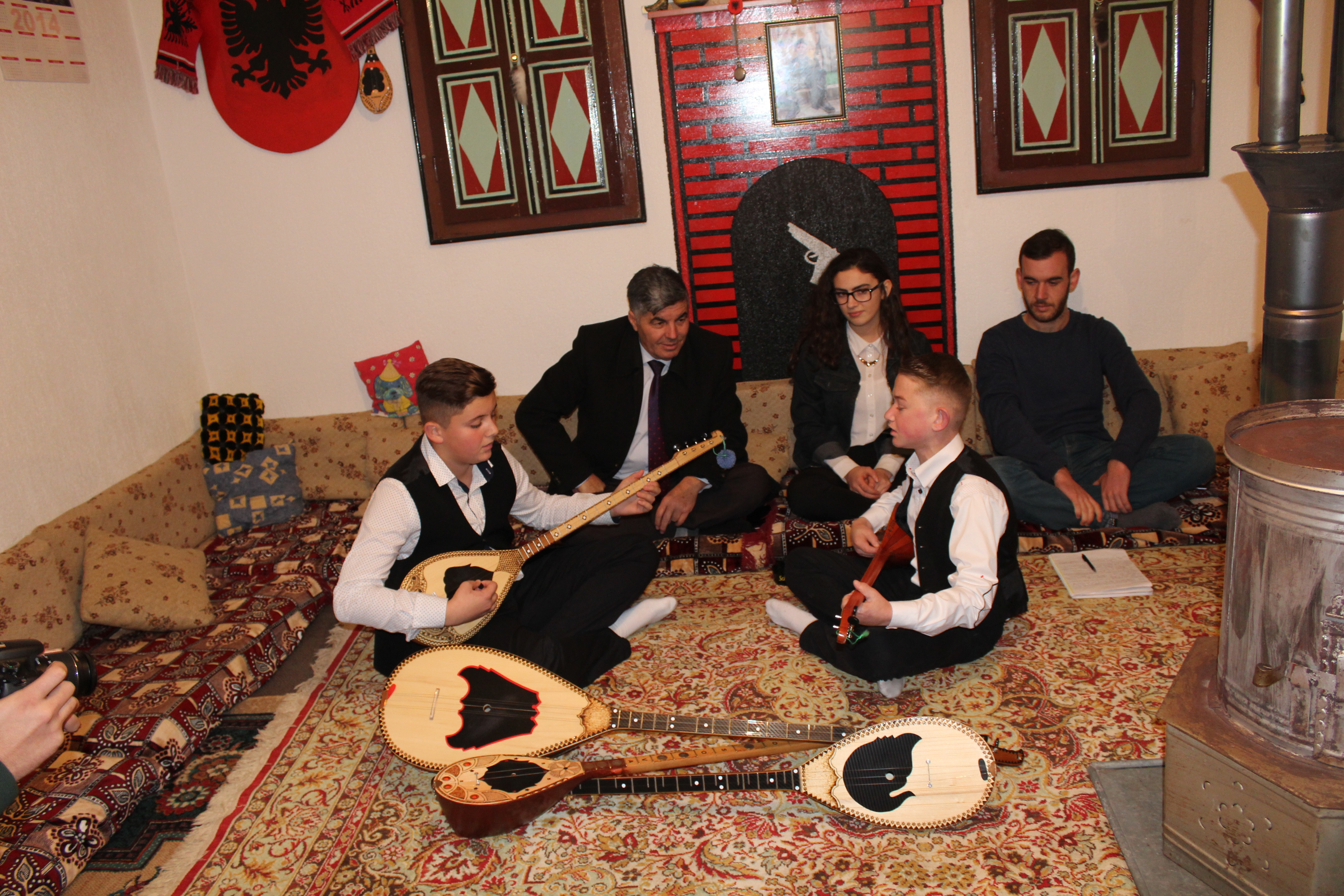
Musicians in Kosovo play çifteli and sharki lutes. Metal frets on the larger sharki are visible in the foreground, showing fret patterns specific to local music.

Its original four strings have been increased to six or even seven. These are grouped to create courses of strings; the instrument has 3 or 4 courses. In the past, frets were moveable, although generally not moved once the instrument was set up. Modern instruments may be inlaid with non-moveable metal frets.

The pattern that the frets are set up to play depends on the tonal system used by the musical tradition a musician participate in. The instrument's body can be made from separate staves, or carved from one piece of wood.

The šargija usually accompanies the violin, and has a jangling quality, similar to the Turkish saz. Musician's play with "complex polyphonic techniques".

The sharki is a similar to or related to the two-string Çifteli or qiftelia, but with more strings.

== Sources ==
=== Additional works which discuss the instrument ===
- Atlas of Plucked Instruments
- JazzStudied Website — San Diego State University
