= Tamburica =

Family of long-necked lutes

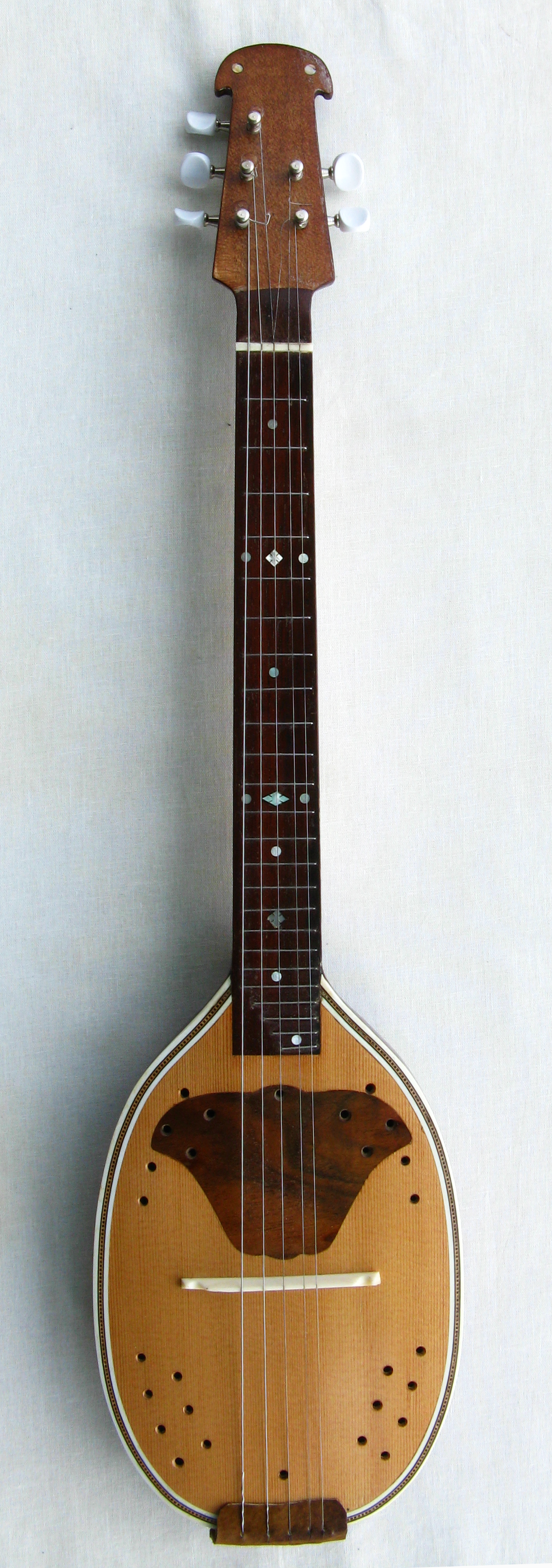

String instrument
- Classification: Plucked

Related instruments
- Chonguri; Dangubica; Samica; Tar (lute); Setar; Tamburica; Tambur (Turkey); Tambouras (Greece); Bouzouki (Greece); Buzuq (Lebanon); Tambura; Baglama; Šargija

Tamburica (/tæmˈbʊərɪtsə/ tam-BOOR-it-sə or /ˌtæmbəˈrɪtsə/ TAM-bər-IT-sə; Serbo-Croatian: tamburica / тамбурица, lit. 'little tambura'; sometimes written tamburrizza, tamburitza or tambura; Bulgarian: тамбура, romanized: tambura; Greek: ταμπουράς, romanized: tampourás; Hungarian: tambura) refers to a family of long-necked lutes popular in the Balkans, especially in Bosnia and Herzegovina, Bulgaria, Croatia (of which it is the national string instrument), Hungary, Montenegro, Serbia (of which it is the national string instrument along with Gusle, present also in Vojvodina, Mačva, and Posavo-Tamnava), and Slovenia. It is also played by ethnic Croats and Hungarians in Burgenland, Austria. All took their name and some characteristics from the Persian tanbur but also resemble the mandolin and guitar in the sense that its strings are plucked and often paired. The frets may be moveable to allow the playing of various modes. The variety of tamburica shapes known today were developed in Serbia and Croatia by a number of indigenous contributors near the end of the 19th century.

== History ==
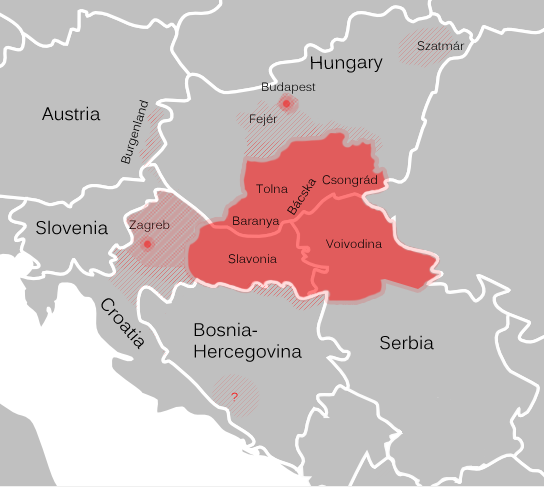
The area where tamburica is played.

There is little reliable data showing how the tamboura entered Central Europe. It already existed during Byzantine Empire, and the Greeks and Slavs used to call "pandouras" (see pandoura) or "tambouras" the ancestor of modern bouzouki. The instrument was referred to as θαμπούριν, thambourin in the Byzantine Empire (confer Digenis Akritas, Escorial version, vv. 826–827, ed. and transl. Elizabeth Jeffrey).

It is said it was probably brought by the Turks to Bosnia, from where the instrument spread further with migrations of Šokci and Bunjevci above the Sava River to all parts of Croatia, Serbia and further, although this theory is not consistent with the generally accepted view that the ancestor of the tamboura is the ancient Greek pandouris.

Until the Great Migration of the Serbs at the end of the 17th century, the type of tambura most frequently used in Croatia and Serbia had a long neck and two or three strings (sometimes doubled). Similar string instruments include the Czech bratsche, Turkish saz and the sargija, çiftelia and bouzouki. The oldest surviving and authenticated tambura known, which is still kept in a museum in Osijek, dates from 1847 and was owned by Pajo Kolarić of Osijek, who was also the founder of the first amateur tamburica orchestra. In honour of him, a festival called tamburitzan is held every year in Osijek.

The development process of the modern tamburica was initiated by several Serbian and Croatian citizens over a period of time. The original long neck, pear shaped tamburica was called the samica and it came in a small or larger size. The kontra, which had 4 strings tuned in an upper A chord was used only as an accompaniment instrument, it originated in Dalmatia. During the autumn of 1875, after a rebellion in Bosnia had broken out, many refugees arrived in Sremski Karlovci. Among these refugees was a man named Marko Capkun who brought two tamburas with him. He called the small one icitel and the larger one sarkija. These tamburas did not use wire strings but rather gut strings pulled through little holes on the neck and tied behind. A woodworker, Josif, in Sremski Karlovci began to make Marko's tamburas, but instead of the traditional pear shape, he made them into the shape of a little guitar. A bird catcher named Joza built a large tambura-much bigger than a guitar in 1877 or 1878. It stretched two thicker and two thinner strings on it and Joza called it the bas or berdon. They developed an orchestra with a little tambura called the prima , 5 kontra and 1 bas.

The modern tamburica, used in Central Europe and the Balkans, was developed in Budapest. At the time the tamburica seemed to disappear, receding further south, as it used to be played throughout the Kingdom of Hungary, as far north as Pozsony. This traditional folk instrument attracted the interest of local skilled instrument makers, who eventually transformed the instrument, originally made with a carving, into the form and tuning we know today. The transformation took place in the 1900s and the first half of the 1910s, and the model created here has been taken up by traditional ensembles in the current regions.

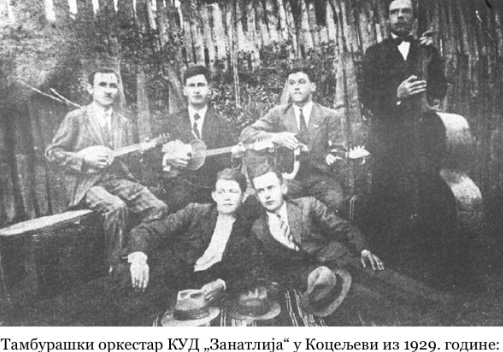
Serbian Tamburica Orchestra “KUD Zanatlija" of Koceljeva was a good example of the coexistence of both “Sremski” and “Farkaš” instruments in a single orchestra. This was once a common occurrence throughout Serbia and Croatia but is seen very rarely nowadays due to the dwindling usage of the “Farkaš” system.

== Types of tamburica ==
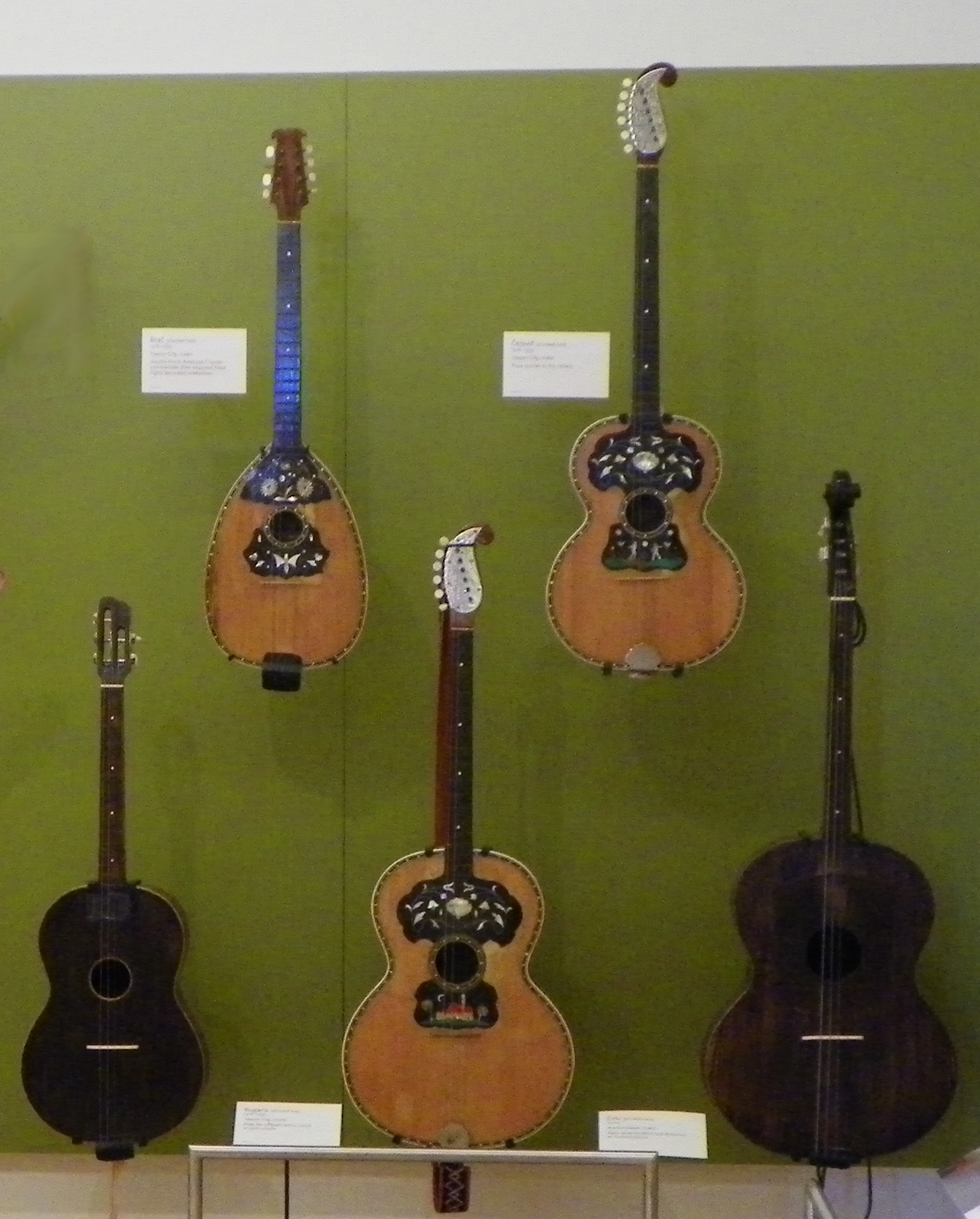
Tamburitza instruments displayed at permanent exhibition at The Musical Instrument Museum (MIM) Phoenix, AZ 85050. Shell inlaid pear like brač and guitar like shaped brač and bugarija are made by Gilg, Sisak, Croatia. Smaller dark colored is brač made by B. Grđan, Gračani, Zagreb. The large dark colored is čelo.

The number of strings on a tamburica varies and it may have single or double-coursed strings or a mixture of both. Double-coursed strings are tuned in unison. The basic forms of tamburica are (Serbian and Croatian name is given with Hungarian name in the parenthesis, if different):

=== Samica ===
The Samica is a solo instrument that is rarely found as a part of the standard tamburica orchestra. The samica is thought to be the ancestor of the modern tamburica and usually consists of two doubled strings. The samica is traditionally played in Slavonia, Baranja and Vojvodina.

=== Dangubica ===
A Dangubica, also known as a "Razbibriga", "Kozarica", "Tikvara", "Potpalac" or "Kuterevka" is another solo instrument very similar to the samica in both shape and sound. It is predominantly played in and around the region of Lika. It is typically larger than the samica and tuned to a lower note.

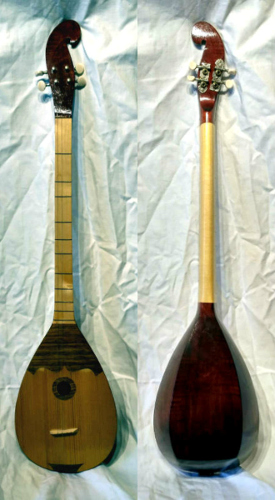
Lička Dangubica

=== Tambura Trožica ===
The Tambura Trožica is a lesser known tambura with three strings (hence the name "trožica" lit. "three stringed"). It was played in the Bosanska Krajina and kozara.

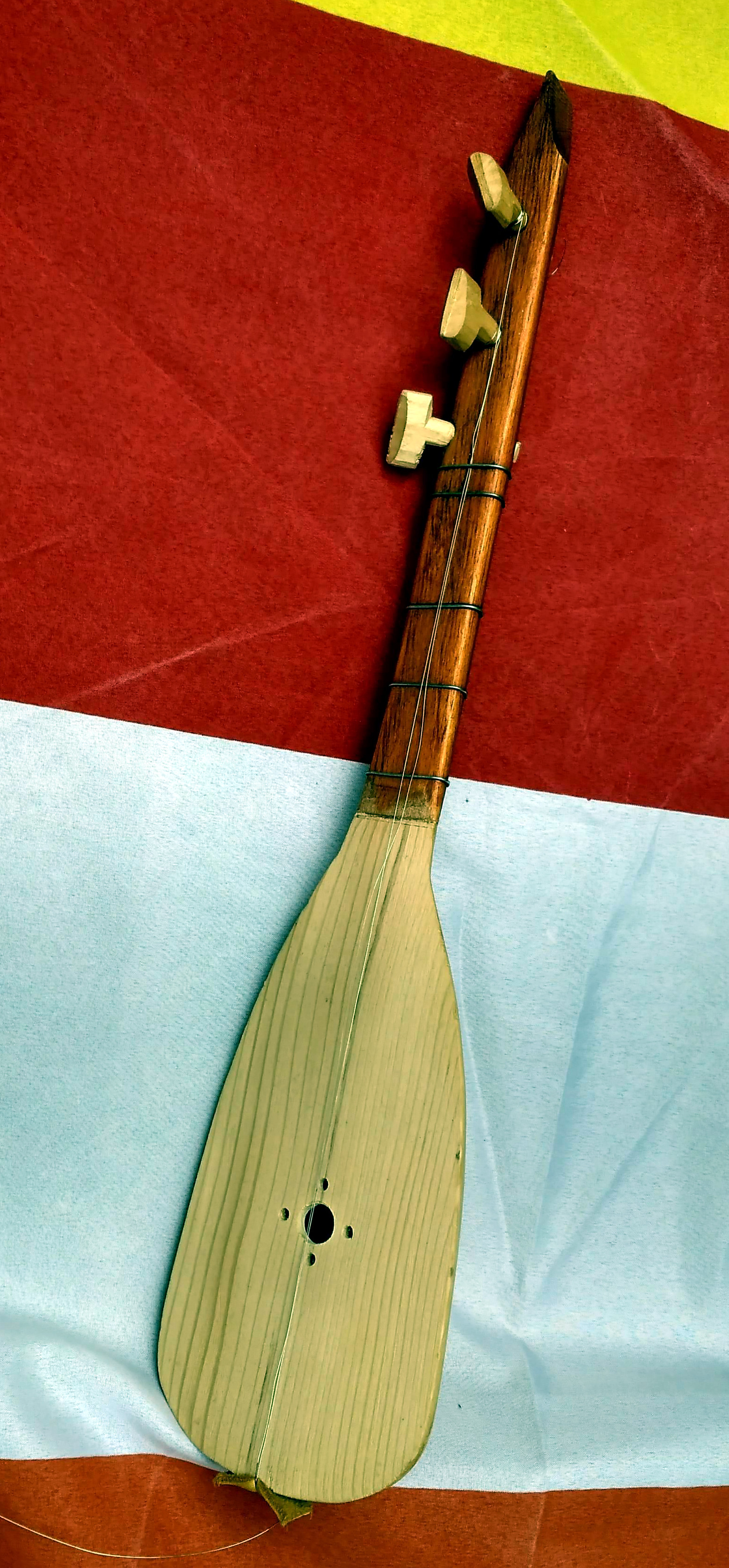
Tambura Trožica

=== Prim (Prím) ===
The prim comes in a lot of shapes. Sometimes it has a different tune, or it has 6 strings instead of five. The standard that most students use has five strings (one double and three single) But sometimes it has six strings (two doubles and 2 singles). It's the smallest in the family ( (about 50 cm long), but is very loud. It is mostly used as a lead instrument or harmonizing instrument. The bisernica (from Serbian and Croatian "biser" meaning "pearl") is another name for the "prim". It's also referred to "Tamburica". The name comes from the Croatian diminutive of the word "Tambura"

=== Brač (basprim, brács, or basszprím) ===
The Brač has one double string and three single strings. (basprim), a slightly bigger, lower instrument than the bisernica but played in a similar fashion.

=== Čelović ===
The čelović – originally has one double string and three single strings. It's a deeper version of the basprim.

=== Bugarija (kontra, or brácsó) ===
The bugarija or kontra (brácsó) – It has four single strings, similar to a guitar, mostly plays chords on the "back beat" for rhythm. A bugarija has four strings, the bottom pair are D, the middle string is A and the top two are tuned F# and F#.

=== Čelo (cselló) ===
The čelo (cselló) – It is similar to the bugarija, but it plays in the bass key, there are no chords and the head is similar to the contrabass, but you play it like any other tambura in the family.

=== Čelo-Berde ===
The čelo-berde or the standing čelo- it has four strings and it is played vertically, but you sit while you play. It is used for the bass but it is not a very popular instrument in the tambura family.

=== Bas ===
The bas or berda (tamburabőgő), also called begeš (bőgős) – four strings. It is the largest instrument in the tamburica family, and is similar to contrabass. It can only be played standing and is used for playing bass lines. It could also be played sitting down by using a bar stool or a double bass chair, & the advantage is it allows the instrument to sit flat against the stomach. Compared to the double bass, it has a shorter bridge and the strings are parallel to the body rather than angled. The neck is fretted. It may have f-holes like a double bass or a round sound hole under the strings like a guitar. Some tamburica orchestras have the bass lines played by a double bassist as that instrument is more commonly available.

There is a view that the first tambura orchestra was formed in Hungary in the 19th century. The instruments' names came from the Hungarian names of the musical instruments of the symphony orchestra ("cselló" meaning cello, "bőgő" meaning contrabass) and from the Hungarian Gipsy bands (bőgős, prím, kontra). These orchestras soon spread to what is now Bosnia, Austria, Slovenia, the Czech Republic and Slovakia.

Types of tamburica

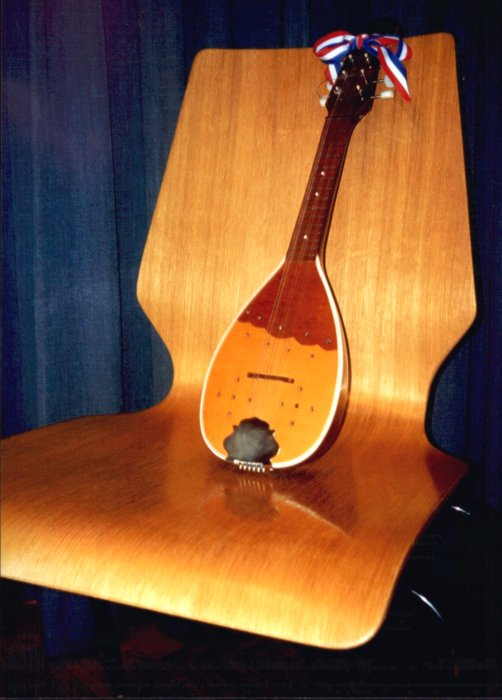
prim (bisernica)

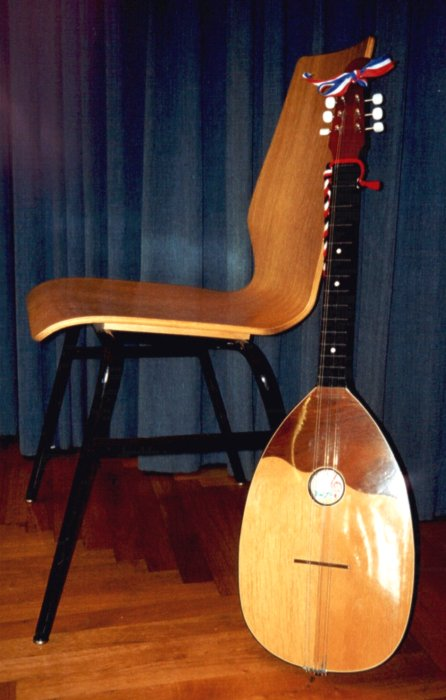
brač (brács, basprim, basszprím, )

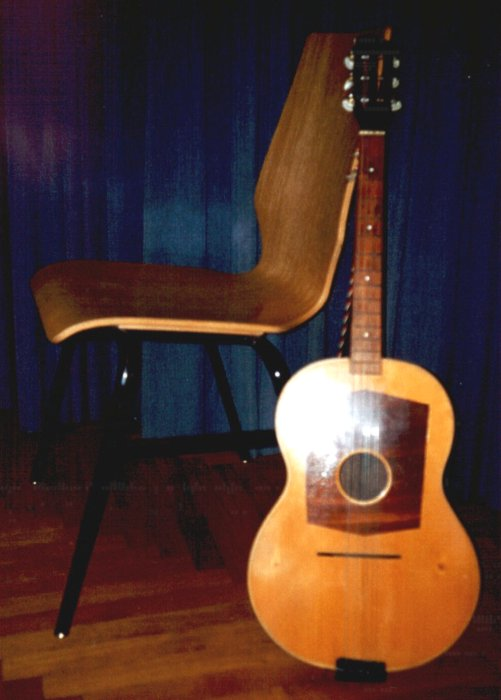
čelović

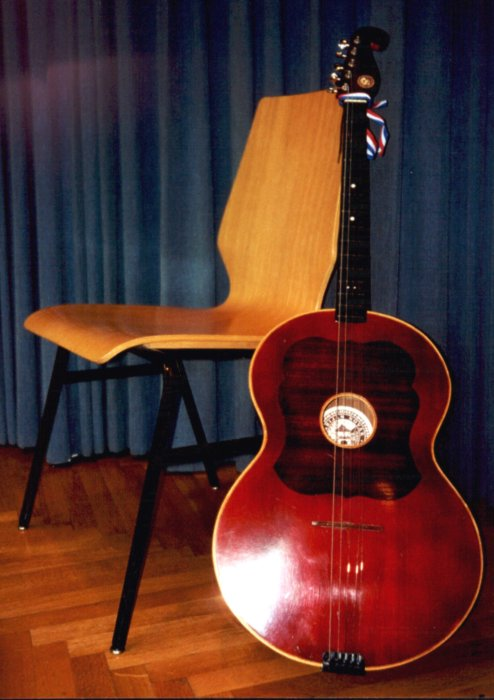
bugarija (brácsó, kontra)

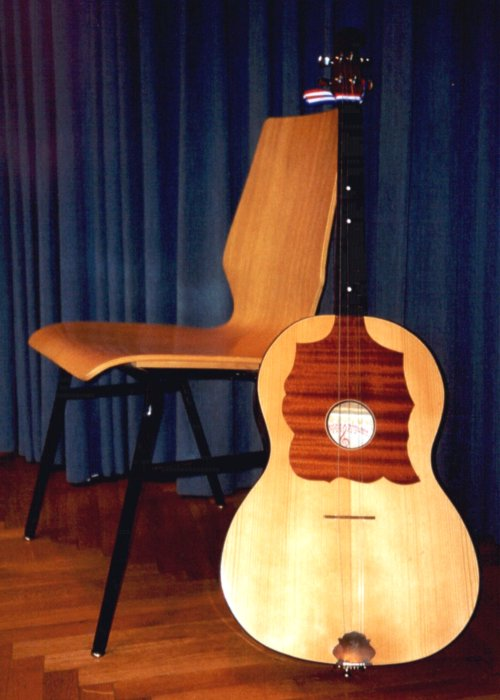
čelo (cselló)

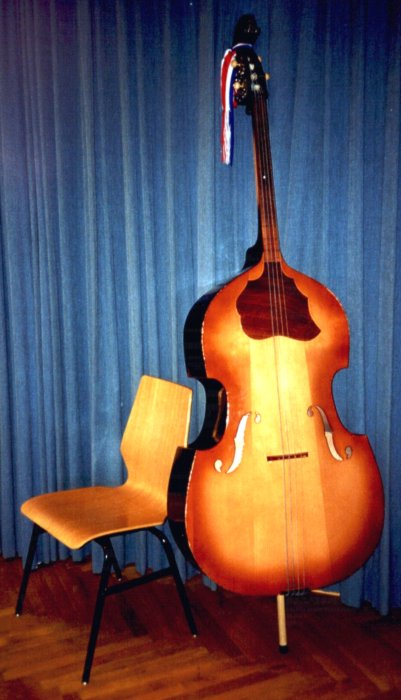
bas (berda, begeš, bőgős, tamburabőgő)

== Parts of tamburica ==
The tamburica is made in three parts; body, neck and head. The body (sound box) was pear-shaped until the middle of the nineteenth century CE, and was built by scooping out the log. Today they are mostly built in the way of the guitar and even the smallest, the bisernica, has a constructed box. The fingerboard has frets . The head usually had a sharpened form, which can be found still on some bisernicas, but the "snail" design later got the supremacy. The snail headstock design dates from at least the 19th century and the Viennese guitars of Johann Georg Stauffer.

== Composers and ensembles ==
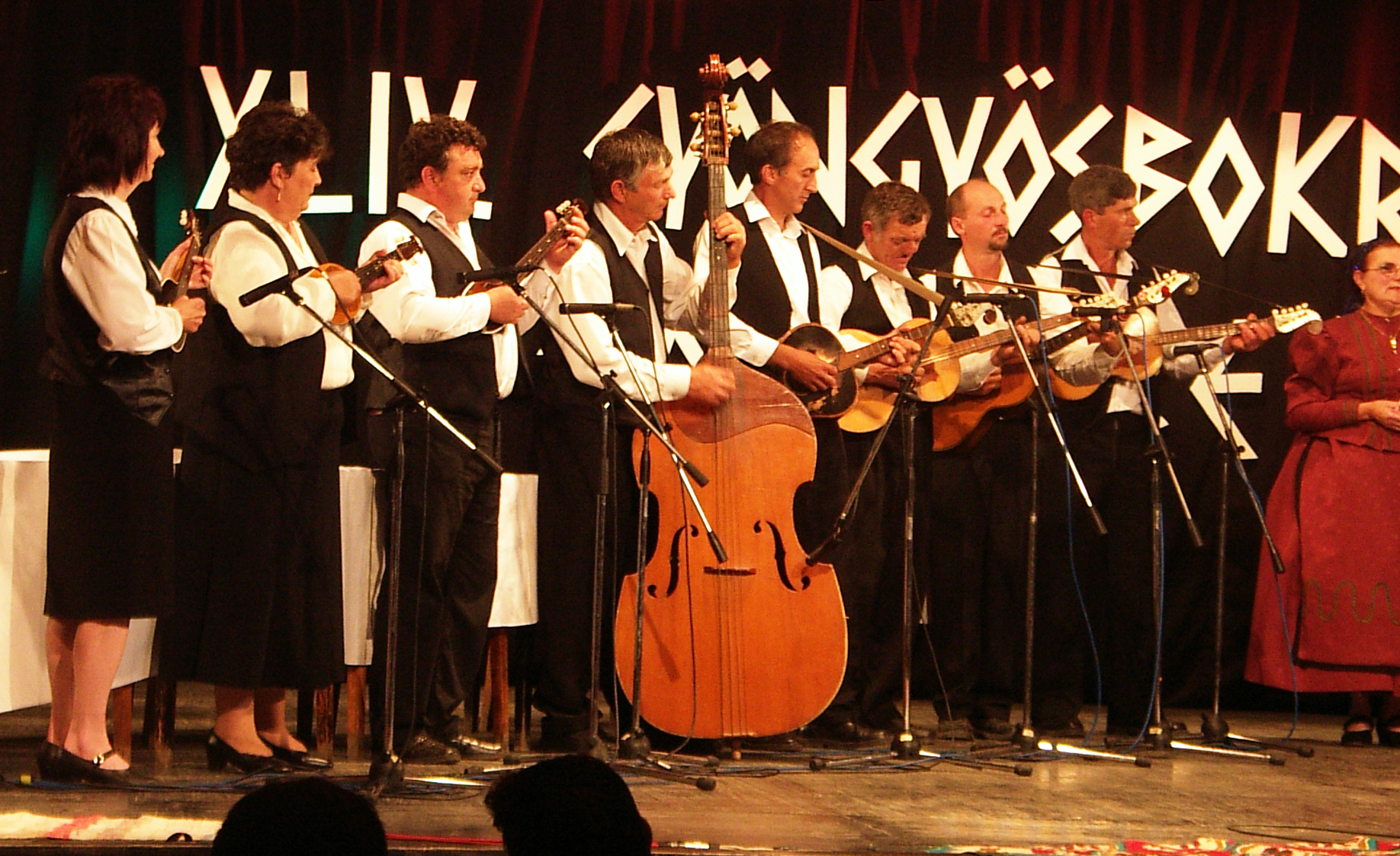
Hungarian tamburica ensemble in Bečej, Serbia

Tamburica orchestras can have various formats from a trio to a large orchestra. A basic trio consists of a prim, a kontra and a čelo. Larger orchestras also have bas-prims and bass-prim-terc tamburas.

The first major composer for the tamburica was Pajo Kolarić, who formed the first amateur tamburica orchestra in Osijek in 1847. Kolarić's student Mijo Majer formed the first tamburica choir led by a conductor, the "Hrvatska Lira", in 1882. Croatian composers for the tamburica include Franjo Ksaver Kuhač, Siniša Leopold and Julije Njikoš. The instrument is associated with Croatian nationalism. Vinko Žganec, an associate of Béla Bartók, collected more than 19,000 Croatian folk songs.

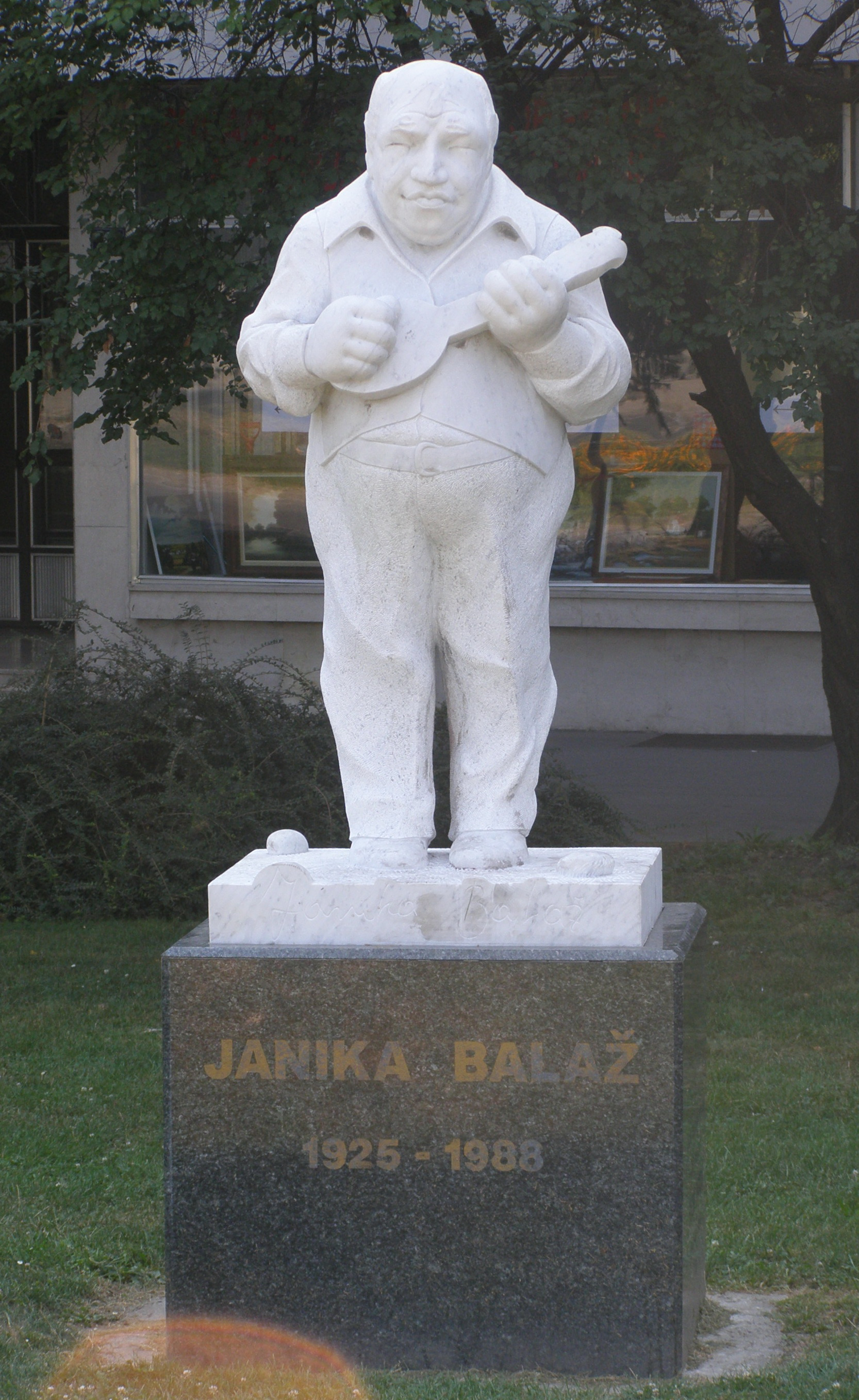
Monument of Janika Balaž with his prim tamburica in Novi Sad, Serbia

The Grand Tamburica Orchestra of Radio Novi Sad was founded in 1951 under the leadership of Sava Vukosavljev, who composed and arranged many pieces for tamburica orchestra and published a comprehensive book Vojvođanska tambura ("The Tambura of Vojvodina"). There are also orchestras of Radio Belgrade and Radio Podgorica, Radio Kikinda etc. Janika Balaž, a member of the Radio Novi Sad orchestra who also had his own octet, was a popular performer whose name became synonymous with the tamburica. Famous tamburica orchestras of Serbia include those of Maksa Popov and Aleksandar Aranicki.

The village of Schandorf in Austria, whose Croatian-speaking inhabitants are descended from 16th Century Croatian immigrants, is the home of a tamburica orchestra, a reflection of its ethnic heritage. The orchestra performs frequently, often outside the village.

== In popular culture ==
=== Films about tamburicas ===
- The Popovich Brothers of South Chicago (1978)
  Directed by Jill Godmilow, Martin Koenig and Ethel Raim. Produced by Mary Koenig, Ethel Raim and Jill Godmilow.
- Ziveli! Medicine for the Heart (1987)
  Filmed and directed by Les Blank. Produced by Flower Films in association with the Center for Visual Anthropology, University of Southern California. Based on ethnography by Andre Simic. El Cerrito, California: Flower Films & Video. ISBN 0-933621-38-8.

== Publications ==
Svet Tambure, a magazine about tambura music, published triannually in Serbia.

== See also ==
- Tambouras
- Tanpura
- Tambura
- Tanbur
- Tambur
- Marko Nešić (born 1872)
- Zvonko Bogdan
