= Samica (musical instrument) =

Stringed instrument

String instrument
- Classification: Plucked

Related instruments
- Dangubica; Tar (lute); Setar; Tamburica; Bouzouki (Greece); Buzuq (Lebanon); Tambura; Baglama; Šargija

The samica (meaning 'alone' in Croatian and Serbian, due to it being played solo) is a small stringed and fretted traditional Croatian and Serbian folk instrument.

Its overall shape is similar to that of the dangubica, and has up to four strings. One of these strings is used to play a melody, the rest being used as drones, playing a single note.

The samica is often played to accompany dancing and singing. Along with the dangubica, the samica is one of the forerunners of the modern tamburitza.
