= Choghur =

Musical instrument

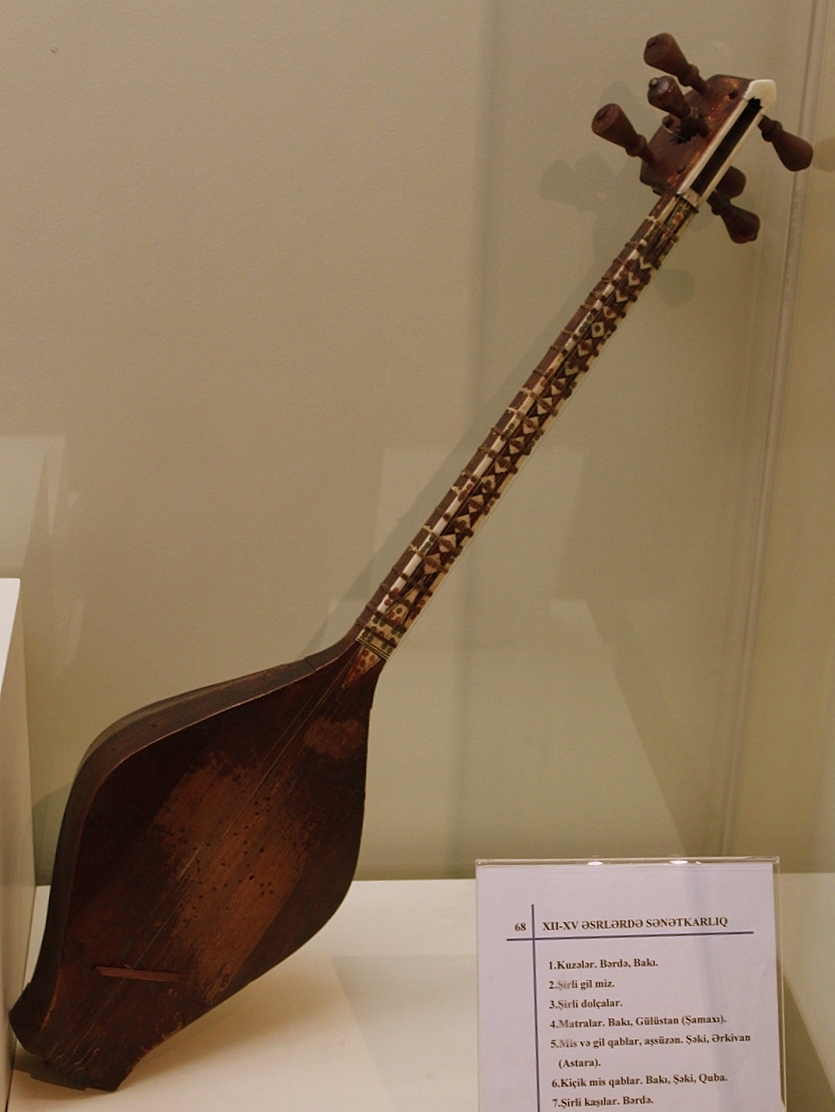
- Choghur in National Museum of History of Azerbaijan

String instrument
- Other names: chaghyr, chagur, chugur, chonguri, chungur, chunguri
- Classification: Plucked

Related instruments
- Tchongouri; Dangubica; Samica; Tar (lute); Setar; Tamburica; Bouzouki (Greece); Buzuq (Lebanon); Tambura; Baglama; Šargija

The choghur (Azerbaijani: Çoğur; Georgian: ჩონგური) is a plucked string musical instrument common in Azerbaijan and Georgia. It has 4 nylon strings.

The choghur dates back to the 12th to 16th centuries, the period between the gopuz and the Bağlama.

In the Caucasus, Iran and Anatolia, and in Sufi traditions, darvishes and ashugs used an instrument called the "chaghyr" /"chagur"/ "chugur" / "choghur" / "chungur".

Presumably, the name "choghur" means "the musical instrument used to appeal to God and truth".

In Azerbaijani the word "chaghir" means "to call", "to appeal". It may be assumed that the name of the instrument originates from the expression "chal-chaghyr" (festivity or celebration), which was later changed to "choghur".

Various historical sources indicate that the choghur was used to create a high battle spirit among the soldiers of the medieval Safavid state's army.

In the "Jahanarai Shah Ismayil Safavi" annals, for describing the situation at the beginning of the 16th century, several lines are devoted to such an occasion:

"At the head of the victoriously striding army, chukurs played and Turks-Varsakgs sang in order to raise the battle spirit of the warriors."

In his work "Turkmen Times in the South", Ali Reza Yalchin tells about the nine strings, 15 frets and perfect timbre of the choghur. It is possible to conclude from historical facts that in the 12th-13th centuries, the choghur replaced the ozan gopuz. And in the 15th-16th centuries, the choghur was replaced by the saz. But some versions of the choghur that were spread throughout the Caucasus and among the Iraqi Turkmens have survived until the present.

The 19th-century choghur stored in the Azerbaijan History Museum has three pairs of strings and 22 frets on its neck. The body of this instrument is made of mulberry wood. The top of the body has a wooden covering that is four mm thick. The neck and head of the instrument are made of nut wood, the pegs of pear wood.

The total length of the instrument is 880 mm. The body is 400 mm long, 225 mm wide and 140 mm tall. Two resonator apertures are drilled on each side of the body, and several apertures are made on top of the sounding board. Its scale goes from the "do" of the small octave to the "sol" of the second octave.

== Georgian Chonguri ==
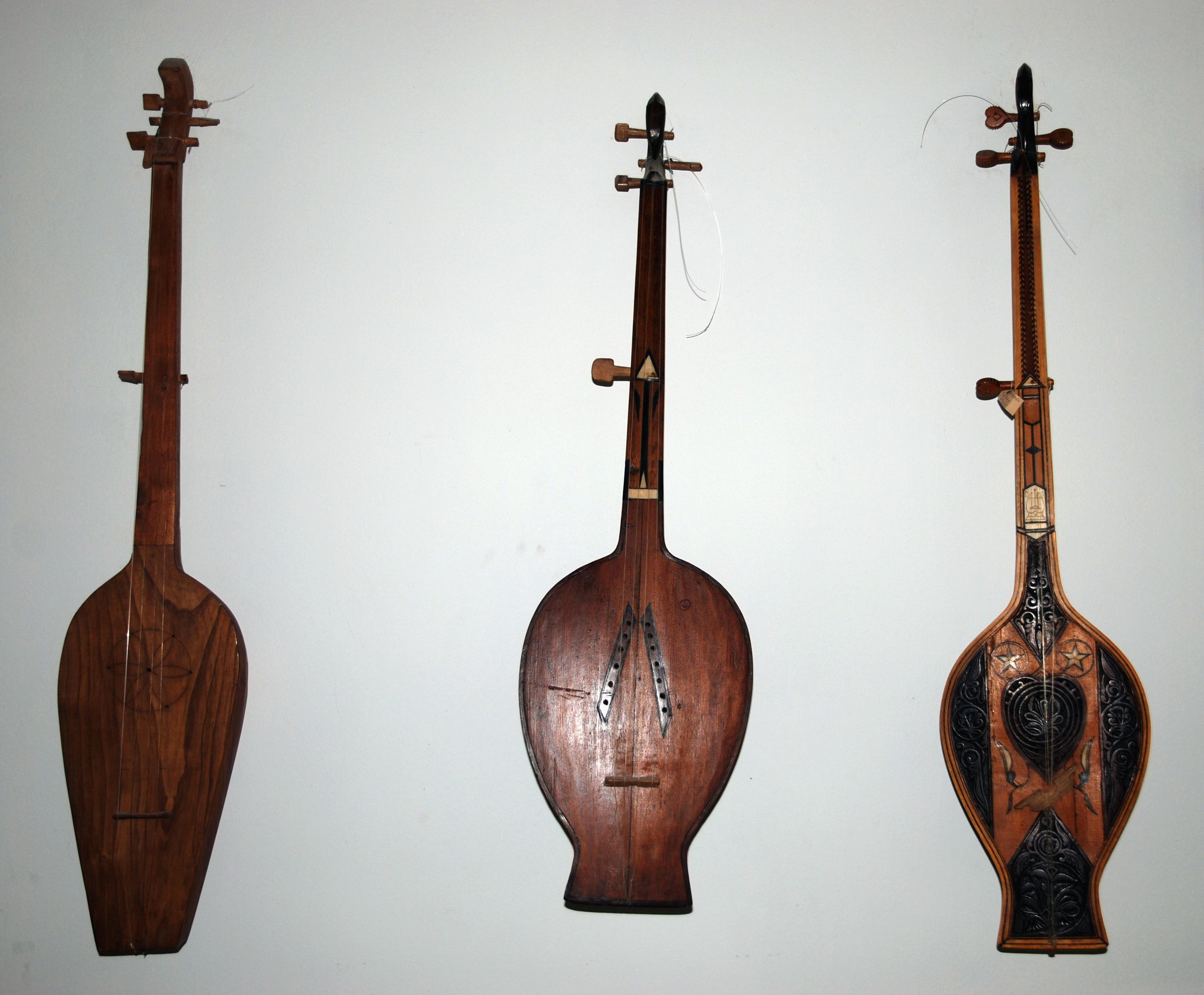
3 Traditional Georgian Chonguri.

The Chonguri (ჩონგური) is an instrument from Georgia related to the Panduri, but larger and with a peg halfway down the neck. It has nylon (traditionally gut) strings. Traditional Chonguri lacks frets, which makes the instrument harder to play compared to Panduri and relies on the player's muscle memory and trained ear. It originates from West Georgia, primarily Guria, Imereti, Samegrelo and Adjara regions. For optimal sound, masters have been using Mulbery tree wood, which has to be dried thoroughly. The full process of making a Chonguri usually takes 1–2 years.

The introduction of the Georgian Chonguri dates back to around the 17th century, and is thought to have evolved after adding the fourth peg to the traditional Panduri.

In today's world, Chonguri has received major upgrades in order to align with modern demands. Those used in recording studios and for stage performances have been fitted with metal frets and pegs to ensure accurate sound, as well as XLR-powered sound pickups, which deliver a strong sound amplified by audio interfaces and stage speakers. Chonguri plays an important role in modern Ethno Jazz and other similar genres derived from traditional folklore. It can be heard on stage alongside Bass, Acoustic and Electric Guitars, as well as various percussion instruments and sometimes a digital synthesizer.

== Chungur ==
Chungur
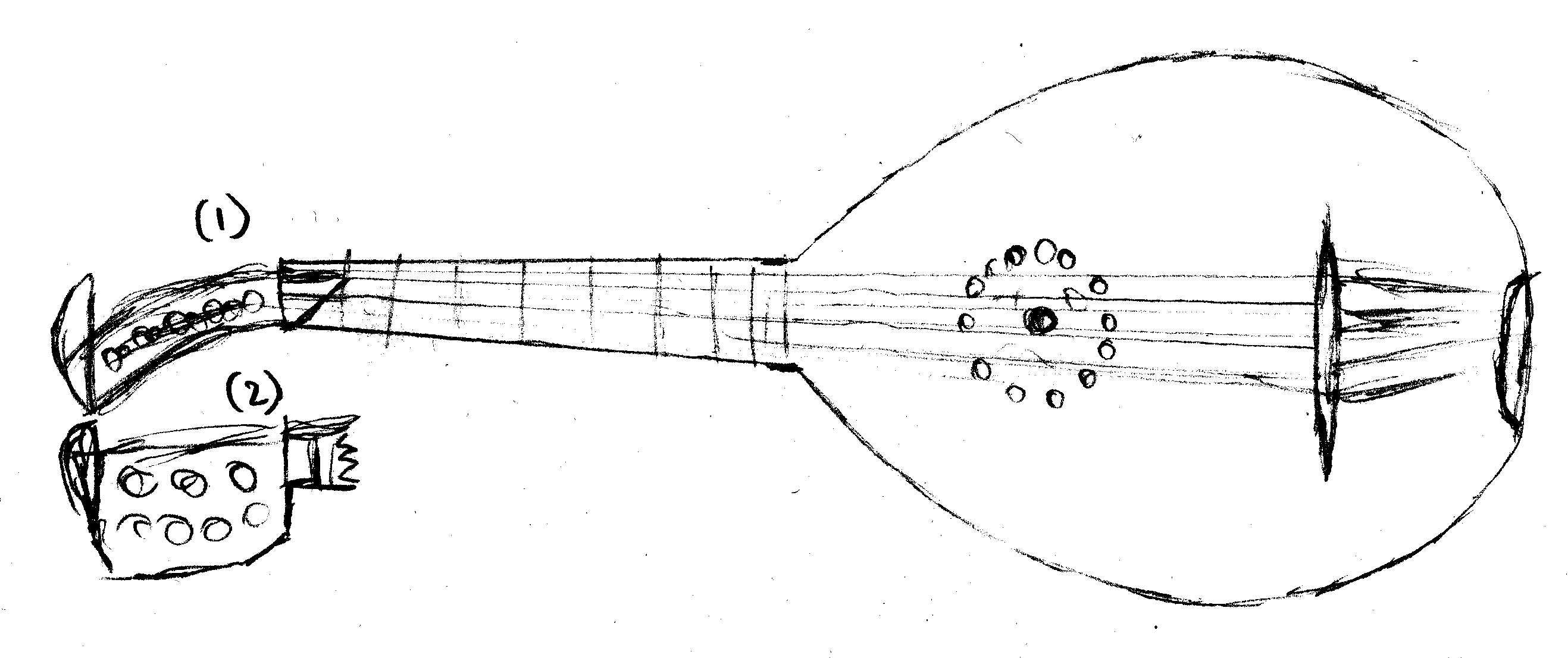

String instrument
- Other names: Chugur
- Classification: Plucked

Related instruments
- Panduri; Pondar; Domra; Mandolin; Tamburica

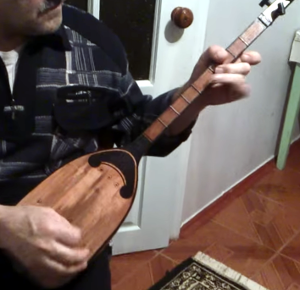
Chugur (Чугур) from the Caucasus mountains region.

The Chungur (Чугур) or Chugur is an instrument played in the Caucasus region, especially Dagestan, and related to the Choghur (from Azerbaijan, etc.) and Chonguri (from Georgia). It has either four single strings or four doubled courses, or seven strings (doubled courses with the lowest course single). It can have a straight peghead (like a saz) or a pegbox with pegs from the side which bends back like a violin scroll.

The soundholes are usually several small holes in the soundboard in a geometric pattern. Traditional ones have tied frets around the neck, and more modern ones have a raised fingerboard with metal inlaid frets.

The small round body (unlike the spade-shaped chonguri) can be carved from a solid block of wood or made from separate ribs in a round shape like a small lute or domra.
