= Dangubica =

Musical instrument

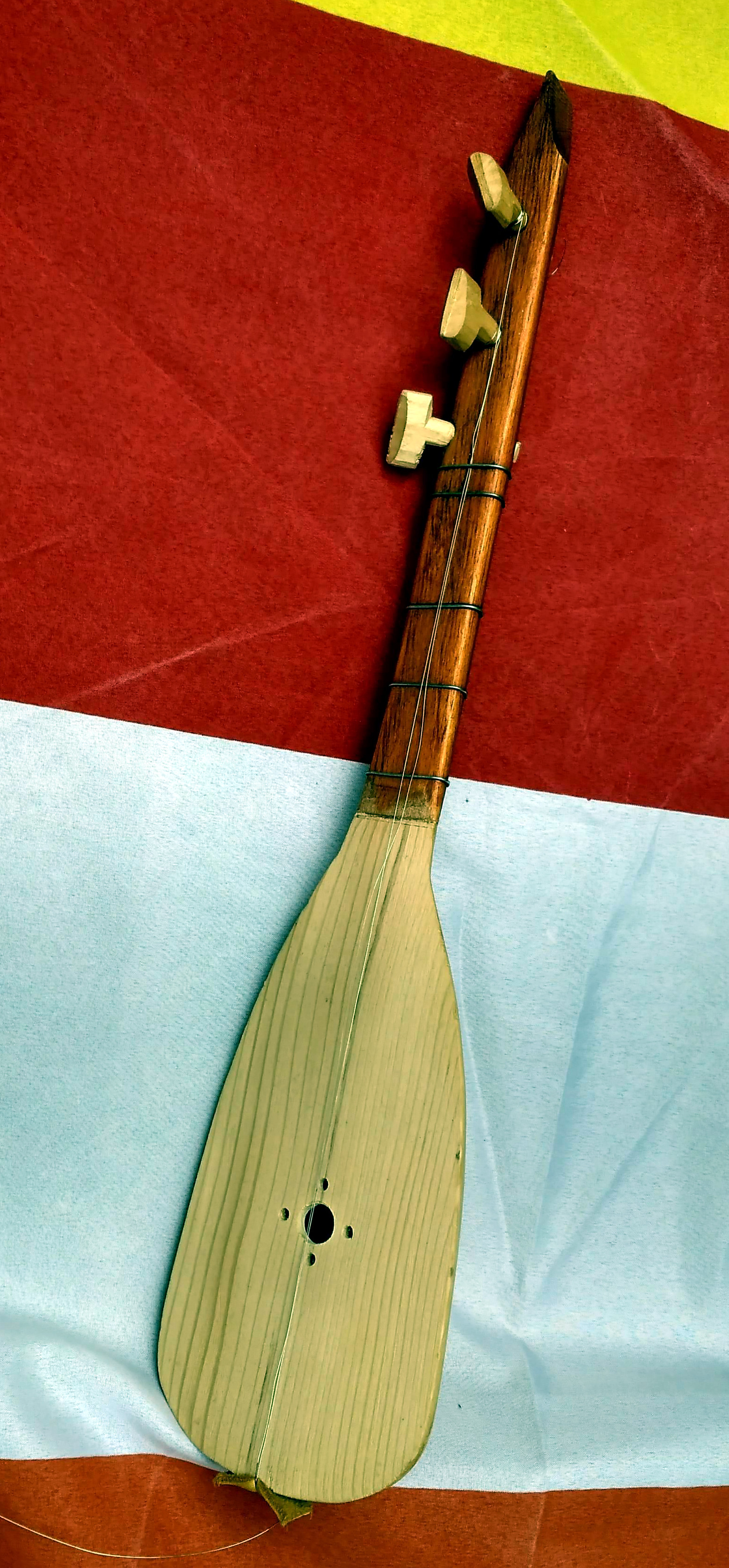
- Dangubica or Samica, a stringed instrument from Croatia and Serbia (bridge missing.)

String instrument
- Classification: Plucked

Related instruments
- Tambouras; Tambura; Tamburica; Bouzouki (Greece); Buzuq (Lebanon); Baglama; Baglamas; Choghur; Tar (lute); Setar; Šargija

The dangubica or samica is a small Serbian and Croatian stringed instrument with two courses with either one or two strings each; a long, fretted neck; and a pear-shaped body.

One string (or pair or strings) is used to play the melody, while the second plays a continuous note, known as the drone.

Loosely translated, the word danguba means "to lose the day," referring to the instrument's origins among shepherds, who usually played alone as a way to pass the time. This also helps to explain the fact that tuning of the dangubica is widely varied.

It is related to the Turkish saz and tamburitza orchestra instruments.
