= Balkan tambura =

Stringed instrument

Tambura
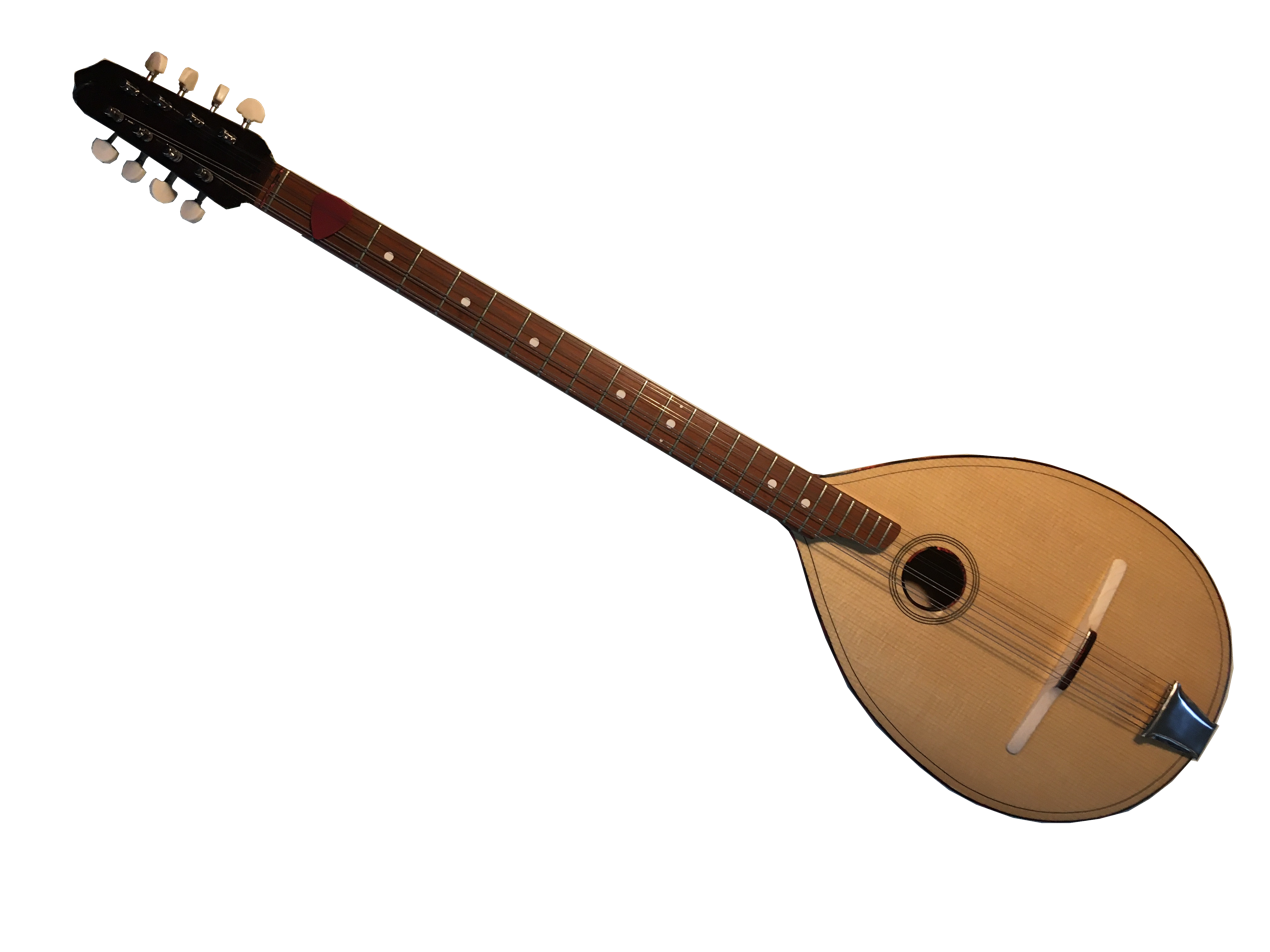
- Bulgarian tambura

String instrument
- Other names: Balkan Tamburası
- Classification: Plucked string instrument
- Hornbostel–Sachs classification: 321.322
- Developed: Balkans, Turkey

The balkan tambura, balkan tamburası or tambura is a stringed instrument that is played as a folk instrument in the Balkans, particularly in Bosnia and Herzegovina, Bulgaria, Croatia, Hungary, Montenegro, North Macedonia, Serbia (especially in Vojvodina region) and Slovenia. It has doubled steel strings and is played with a plectrum, similar to mandolin and bağlama.

== The Bulgarian tambura ==
The Bulgarian tambura has 8 steel strings in 4 doubled courses. All the courses are tuned in unison, with no octaves. It is tuned D3 D3, G3 G3, B3 B3, E4 E4. It has a floating bridge and a metal tailpiece. The instrument body is often carved from a single block of wood.

== The Macedonian tambura ==
The Macedonian tambura has 4 steel strings in 2 doubled courses. It is tuned A A, D D (or another pitch but at the same relative intervals of a fourth) when playing melodies based on A tonic upon A drone. It also may be tuned G G, D D (or another pitch but at the same relative intervals of a fifth) when playing melodies based on G tonic upon G drone. Sometimes octave strings are used on the lower course. It has a floating bridge and a metal tailpiece. The instrument body is more often made from staves like a lute.

== Playing technique ==
It is played with a plectrum, playing short tones which are plucked from the top down, while playing long tones with fast tremolo. For solo playing or to accompany a singer, they are played in the traditional manner, which is to play a melody on the highest course whilst using the other course or courses as a drone. The more modern way, which is more used in orchestras or other groups, is to play single line melodies using all courses.

== Form ==
The tambura has a long, narrow neck with typically 18 to 24 frets. The frets are nowadays always arranged in the normal Western 12 note scale, although in the past the Farkas system was also used. The Bulgarian tambura's body is rather shallow and flat, whereas the Macedonian tambura has a much more rounded, bowl-like body.

== See also ==
- Instruments of the Tamburica orchestras
- The mandolin family
- The bouzouki
- Tambura
- Bağlama
