= Baglamas =

Musical instrument

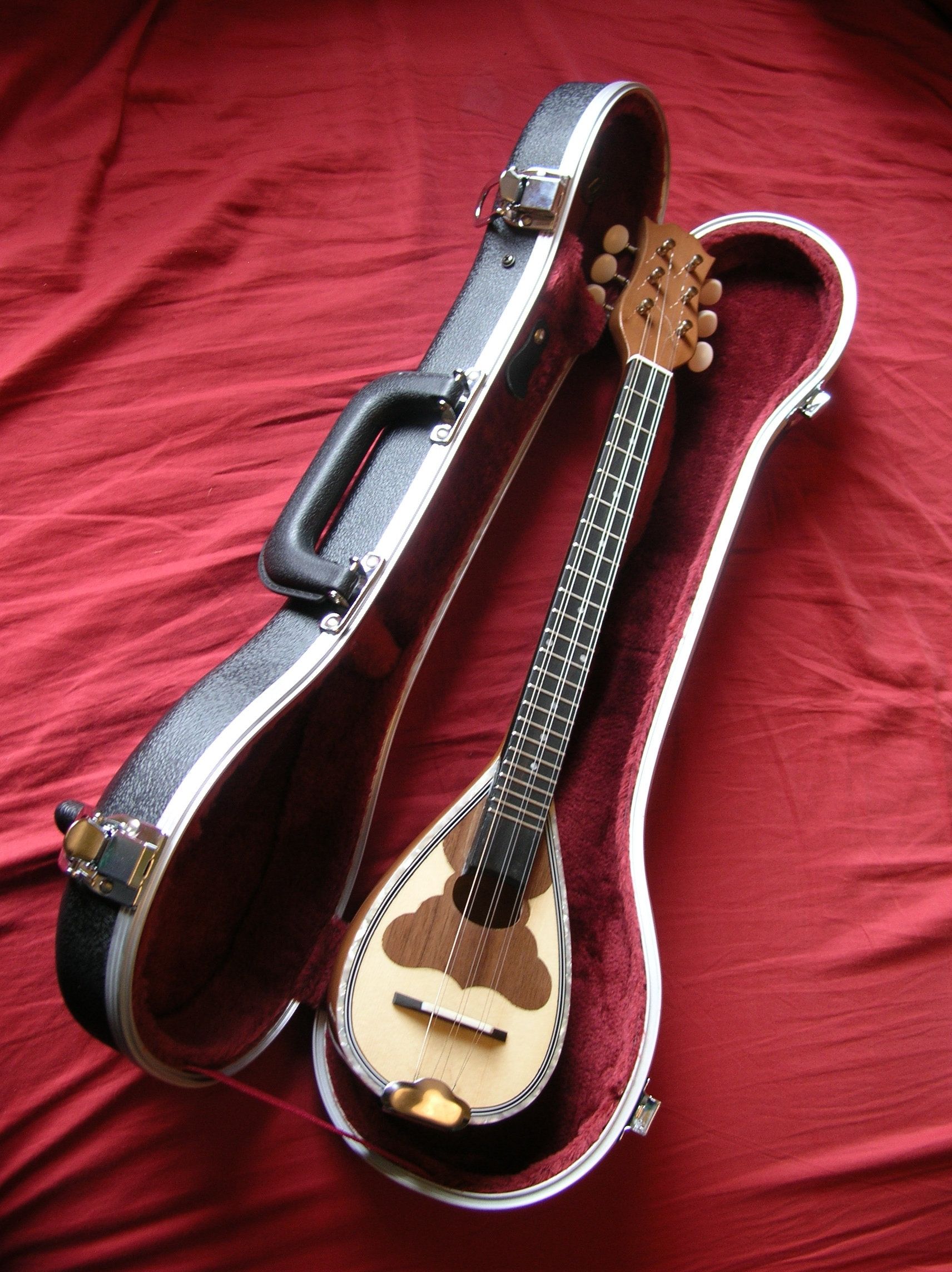
- Greek baglamas in opened case

String instrument
- Other names: Baglamadaki
- Classification: Necked bowl lutes; String instruments
- Hornbostel–Sachs classification: 321.321-6 (Composite chordophone sounded with a plectrum)

Related instruments
- Barbat (lute), Baglamadaki, Bağlama, Biwa, Bouzouki, Dombra, Domra, Dutar, Lavta, Lute, Mandocello, Mandola, Mandolin, Mandole, Oud, Pipa, Qanbus

Baglamas tuning

The baglamas (Greek: μπαγλαμάς Turkish: bağlama), plural baglamades) or baglamadaki (μπαγλαμαδάκι), a long necked bowl-lute, is a plucked string instrument used in Greek music; it is a smaller version of the bouzouki pitched an octave higher (nominally D-A-D), with unison pairs on the four highest strings and an octave pair on the lower D. Musically, the baglamas is most often found supporting the bouzouki in the Piraeus city style of rebetiko.

The body is often hollowed out from a piece of wood (skaftos, construction) or else made from a gourd, but there are also baglamades with staved backs. Its small size (typically 21.5in, 55cm in total length, but only 4.5in, 12cm wide) made it particularly popular with musicians who needed an instrument transportable enough to carry around easily or small enough to shelter under a coat. During parts of the 20th century, players of the bouzouki and baglamas were persecuted by the government, and the instruments were smashed by the police.

== See also ==
- Bouzouki
- Pandura
- Tambouras
- Cretan lyra
- Tzouras
