= Buzuq =

Musical instrument

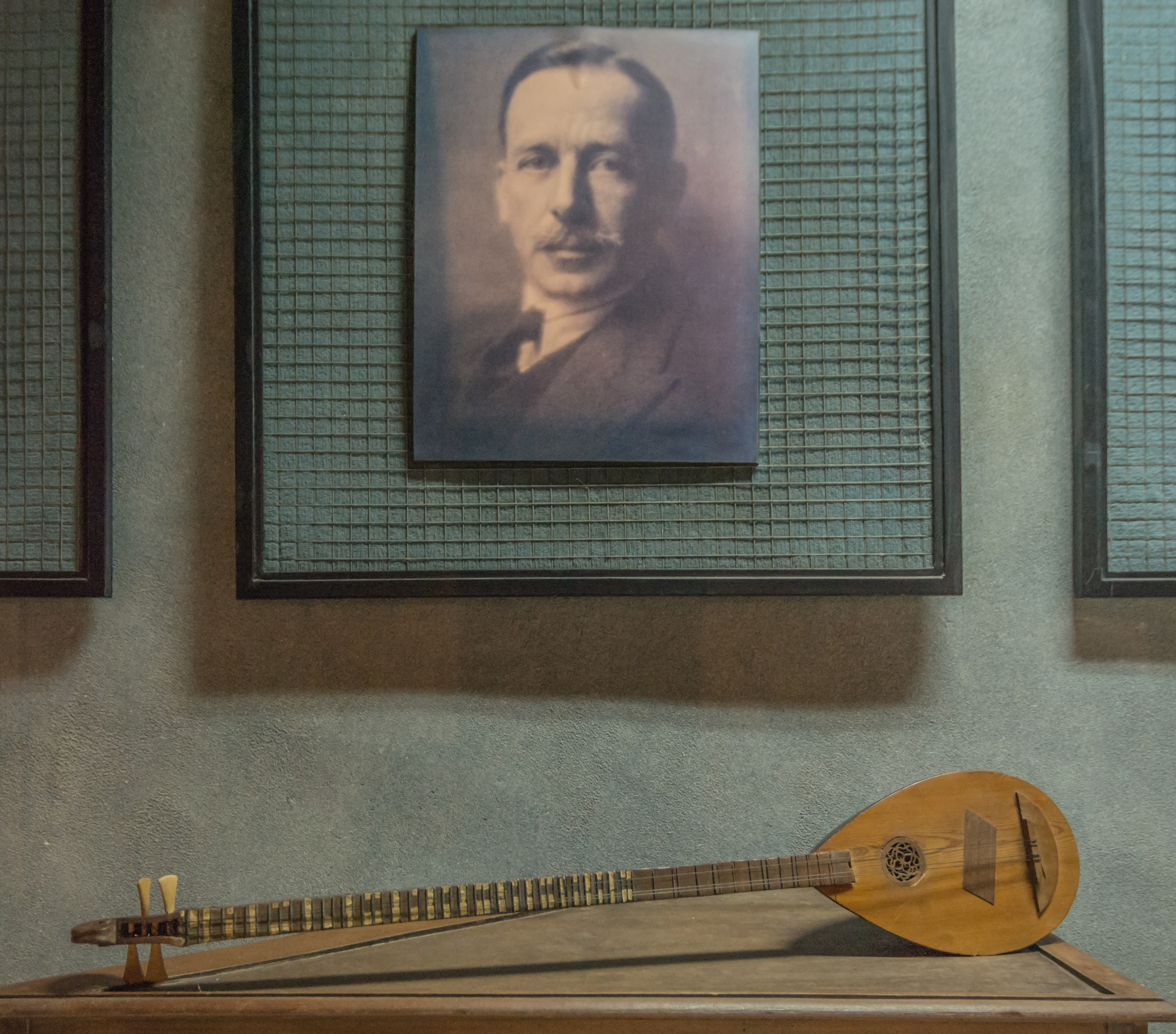
- Classification: Plucked string instrument

Related instruments
- Bağlama (Turkey); Bouzouki (Greece); Saz (Turkey and Iran); Choghur (Azerbaijan and Georgia); Tanbur

The buzuq (Arabic: بزق; also transliterated bozuq, bouzouk, buzuk etc.) a long-necked fretted lute, likely originated in the Eastern Mediterranean, particularly in the Levant, where it is prominent in Lebanese, Syrian, and Palestinian music. Its roots may trace back to ancient stringed instruments, evolving into its modern form by the 19th century. The buzuq's metallic strings and thin neck allow for intricate melodies, making it a favored solo instrument in traditional settings. It gained popularity in urban music scenes, especially in Cairo's early 20th-century music halls, where it was adapted for larger ensembles. Today, it remains a key instrument in folk music, often played with a plectrum to produce its distinctive, resonant sound.

== Repertoire and comparison with other instruments ==
It is an essential instrument in the Rahbani repertoire, but it is not classified among the classical instruments of Arab or Turkish music. However, this instrument may be looked upon as a larger and deeper-toned relative of the saz, to which it could be compared in the same way as the viola to the violin in Western music. Before the Rahbanis popularized the use of this instrument, the buzuq had been associated with the music of Lebanon and Syria.

Buzuk and other saz instruments date back to ancient times and originated in Persia. Similar instrument called barbat (Persian: بربت) or barbud was a lute of Greater Iranian or Persian origin.

Unlike the short-necked unfretted oud, the buzuq has a longer neck, smaller body and frets tied to the neck, which can be moved to produce the microtonal intervals used in the many maqamat (musical modes). Typically, it is furnished with two courses of metal strings which are played with a plectrum, offering a metallic yet lyrical resonance. Some instruments have three courses and up to seven strings total.

== Etymology ==
The name of the instrument may come from Turkish bozuk (broken or disorderly), it refers to Bozuk düzen bağlama, a tuning of Turkish baglama. Another theory on the origin of the name is that it comes from the Persian expression tanbur e bozorg, meaning a large tanbur style lute.

== See also ==
- Tanbur
