= Music of Uzbekistan =

The music of Uzbekistan has reflected the diverse influences that have shaped the country. It is very similar to the music of the Middle East and is characterized by complicated rhythms and meters. Because of the long history of music in the country and the large variety of music styles and musical instruments, Uzbekistan is often regarded as one of the most musically diverse countries in Central Asia.

== Classical music of Uzbekistan ==
The music of what is now Uzbekistan has a very long and rich history. Shashmaqam, a Central Asian classical music style, is believed to have arisen in the cities of Bukhara and Samarqand in the late 16th century. The term "shashmaqam" translates as six maqams and refers to the structure of music with six sections in different musical modes, similar to classical Persian traditional music. Interludes of spoken Sufi poetry interrupt the music, typically beginning at a low register and gradually ascending to a climax before calming back down to the beginning tone.

After Turkestan became part of the Russian Empire in the 19th century, first attempts were taken to record national melodies of Turkestan. Russian musicians helped preserve these melodies by introducing musical notation in the region.

In the 1950s, Uzbek folk music became less popular, and the genre was barred from radio stations by the Soviets. They did not completely dispel the music. Although banned, folk musical groups continued to play their music in their own ways and spread it individually. After Uzbekistan gained independence from the USSR in the early 1990s, public interest revived in traditional Uzbek music. Nowadays Uzbek television and radio stations regularly play traditional music.

The people's Artist of Uzbekistan Turgun Alimatov is an Uzbek classical and folklore composer, and tanbur, dutar, and sato player. His compositions include "Segah", "Chorgoh", "Buzruk", "Navo", and "Tanovar". His image is associated with national pride and has been presented as the symbol of Uzbek classical music to the world.

Another well-known Uzbek composer is Muhammadjon Mirzayev. His most famous compositions include "Bahor valsi" ("The Spring Waltz") and "Sarvinoz". "Bahor valsi" is played on Uzbek television and radio channels every spring.

Sherali Joʻrayev was a singer of traditional Uzbek music. However, he fell out of favour with the Uzbek government, who banned his performances on Uzbek TV as well as his public performances beginning in 2002. He still performed at Uzbek wedding parties and in other countries to popular acclaim.

In recent years, singers such as Yulduz Usmonova and Sevara Nazarkhan have brought Uzbek music to global audiences by mixing traditional melodies with modern rhythms and instrumentation. In the late 2000s, Ozodbek Nazarbekov mixed contemporary music with elements of traditional Uzbek music.

== Western Classical music in Uzbekistan ==
Uzbekistan has also produced many notable composers and performers in the European classical art music idiom, and is home to notable symphony orchestras, festivals, and contemporary music ensembles. The State Conservatory of Uzbekistan, based in Tashkent and founded in 1936, is the nation's leading higher education institution for the professional training of musicians.

== Contemporary music of Uzbekistan ==
Many forms of popular music, including folk music, pop, and rock music, have particularly flourished in Uzbekistan since the early 1990s. Uzbek pop music is well developed, and enjoys mainstream success via pop music media and various radio stations.

Many Uzbek singers such as Sevara Nazarkhan, Sogdiana Fedorinskaya, and Rayhon Ganieva have achieved commercial success not only in Uzbekistan but also in other CIS countries such as Kazakhstan, Russia, and Tajikistan.

=== Rock ===
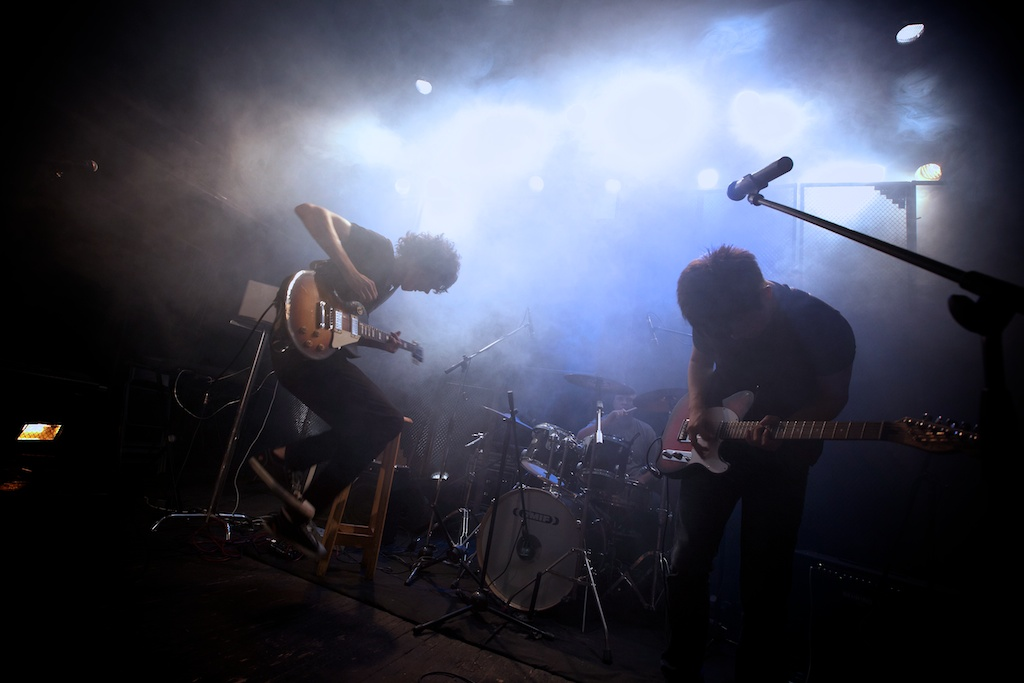
All Tomorrow's Parties performing live at IlkhomRockFest, June 22, 2013

Currently rock music enjoys less popularity than pop music in Uzbekistan.

An Uzbek metal band who has some degree of recognition is Night Wind, a folk metal group. Other Uzbek metal groups include Iced Warm, Salupa, Zindan, and Agoniya (Russian: Агония).

=== Rap ===
Rap music has become popular among Uzbek youth. Rappers such as Shoxrux became very popular among young people in the 2000s. However, the Uzbek government censors rap music. It has set up a special body to censor rap music because it believes this type of music does not fit the Uzbek musical culture.

== Musicians ==
- Ari Babakhanov
- Lola Astanova

== Artists and bands ==
=== Uzbek artists ===
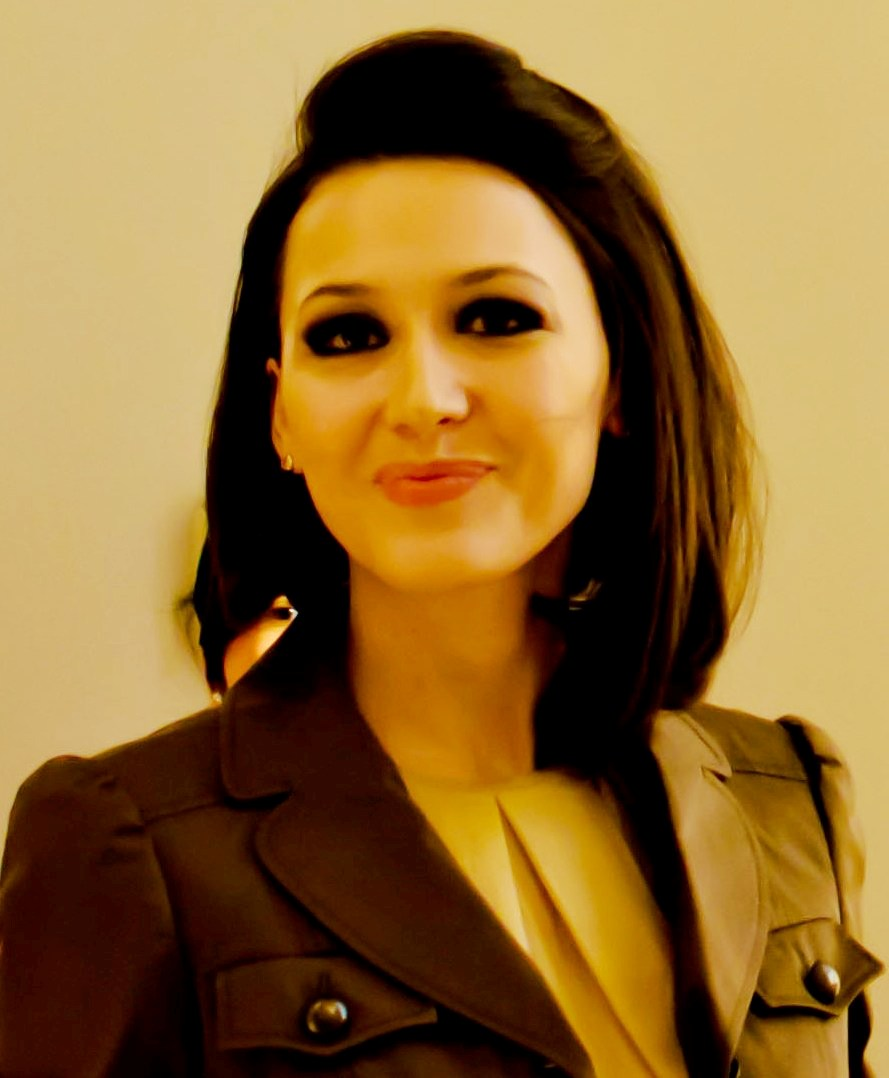
Lola Yoʻldosheva

- Alisher Uzoqov
- Botir Zokirov
- Eson Kan
- Daler Xonzoda
- Feruza Jumaniyozova

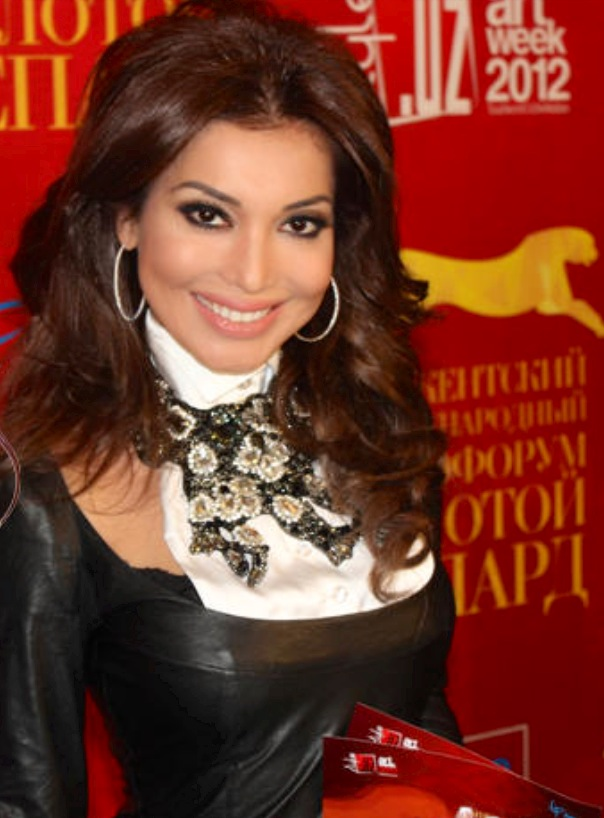
Rayhon Gʻaniyeva

- Lola Yoʻldosheva
- Rayhon
- Sevara Nazarkhan

=== Uzbek bands ===
- Bolalar
- Dado
- HAVAS guruhi
- Yalla

== Composers in the western classical tradition ==
- Dilorom Saidaminova
- Dmitri Yanov-Yanovsky
- Felix Yanov-Yanovsky
- Mirsodiq Tojiyev
- Mutavakkil Burhonov
- Polina Medyulyanova

== Instruments ==
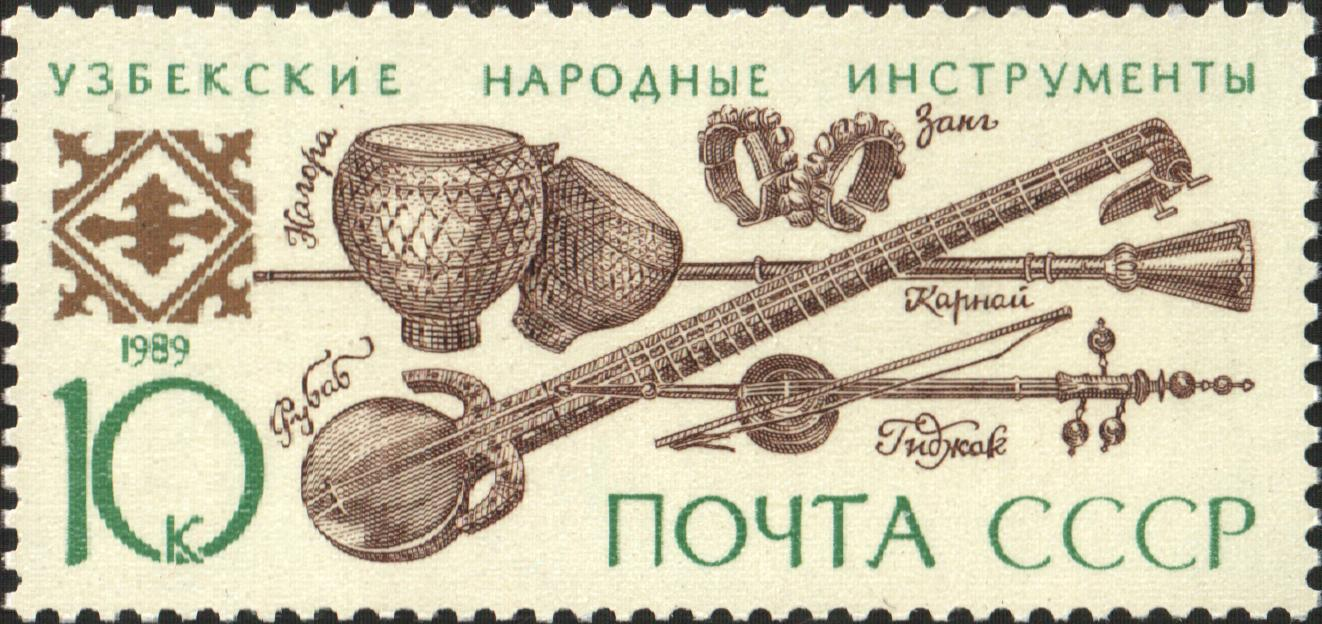
Soviet postage stamp depicting musical instruments of Uzbekistan

Many musical instruments are played in Uzbekistan. Traditional instruments include:

=== String ===
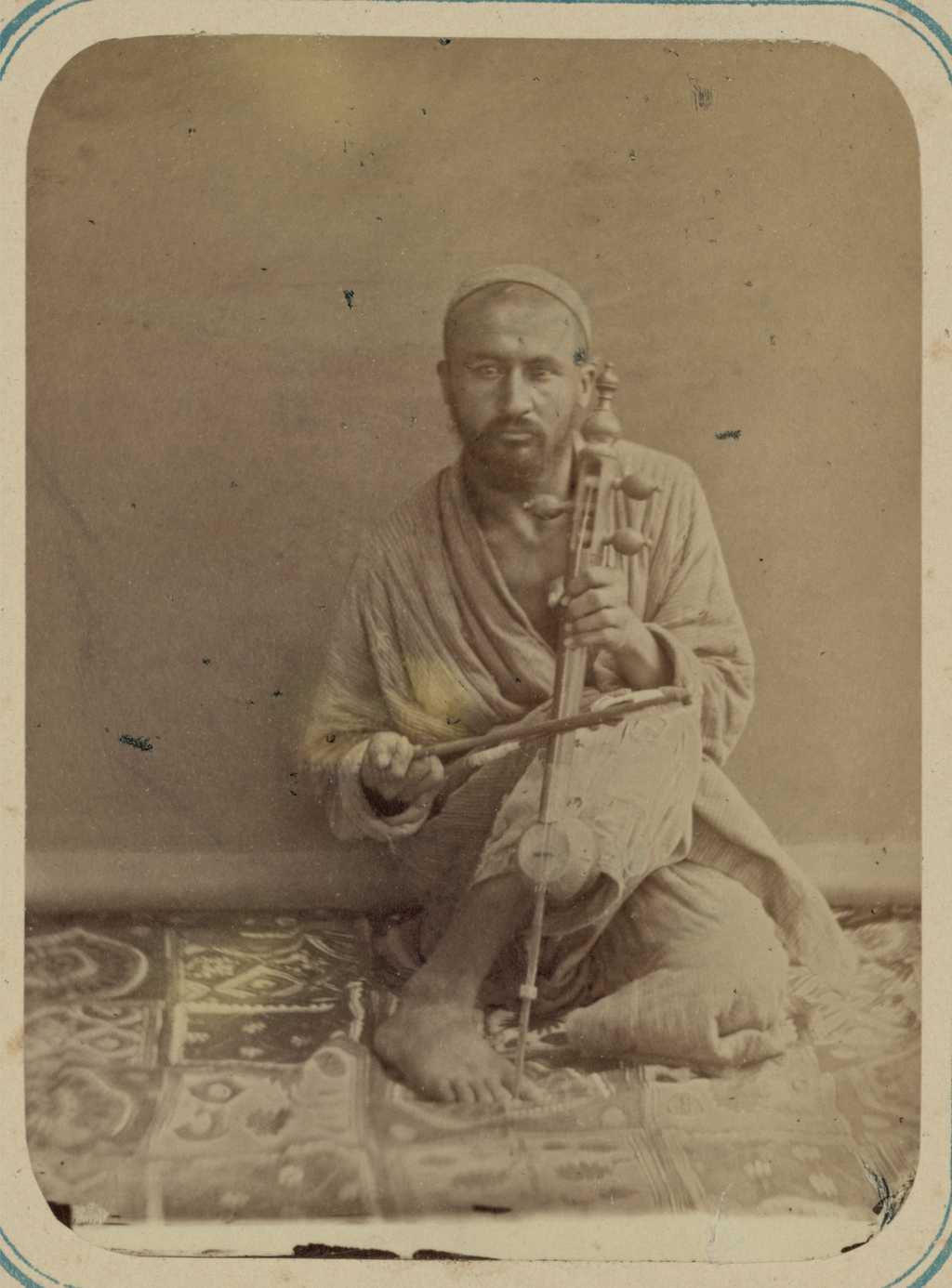
Gydzhak or Gʻijjak spike fiddles in Russian Turkestan

- Dutor (long-necked fretted lute)
- Rubob (long-necked fretted lute)
- Tanbur (long-necked fretted lute)
- Tor (long-necked fretted lute)
- Ud (long-necked fretted lute)
- Gʻijjak (spike fiddle)
- Chang (struck zither)

=== Wind ===
- Dili tuiduk
- Karnay (long trumpet)
- Nay (side-blown flute)
- Qoʻshnay (clarinetlike instrument made from reed)
- Surnay (loud oboe)

=== Percussion ===
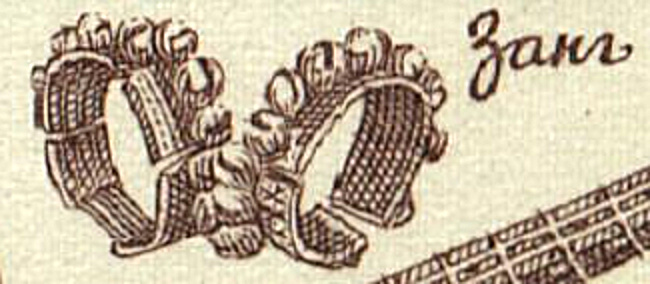
Zang, bracelet of bells from Uzbekistan

- Doira (frame drum)
- Dovul (drum)
- Nogʻora (pot-shaped drum covered with leather on the top)
- Qoshiq (spoons)
- Zang (bracelets)

== See also ==
- Culture of Uzbekistan
