= Hamidov =

Hamidov or Khamidov (Azerbaijani: Həmidov) is a central-Asian masculine surname, its feminine counterpart is Hamidova or Khamidova. It may refer to

- Abdurahim Hamidov (1952–2013), Uzbekistani lutenist
- Isgandar Hamidov (born 1948), Azerbaijani politician
- Shukur Hamidov, Azerbaijani military officer
- Sitora Hamidova (born 1989), Uzbekistani long-distance runner
- Okil Khamidov (born 1961), Polish-Tajikistani film and television director, producer and screenwriter
- Sukhrob Khamidov (born 1975), Tajikistan football forward
