= Anna Vilenskaya =

Russian musicologist, lecturer and composer

- Born: 31 January 1998 (age 28); Saint Petersburg, Russia
- Occupations: Musicologist, lecturer, composer
- Known for: Open Music Lecture Hall
- Website: annavilenskaya.com

Anna Vilenskaya (born 31 January 1998) is a Russian musicologist, lecturer and composer. She founded the Open Music Lecture Hall, a project devoted to music education.

Her lectures examine both classical and popular music, with an emphasis on explaining musical structures to non-specialists. She has produced online courses and podcasts and collaborated with Warner Music Russia on the YouTube programme Theory of the Big Banger. In 2022, she was nominated in the music category of the Forbes Russia 30 Under 30 ranking.

In 2026, her course on medieval and Renaissance music attracted criticism over factual errors; she acknowledged mistakes and announced plans for specialist corrections.

== Early life and education ==
Vilenskaya was born in Saint Petersburg. In interviews, she has described taking an interest in the piano in childhood and discovering at music school that she had absolute pitch.

She graduated from the theory and composition department of the Rimsky-Korsakov Music College in Saint Petersburg, then studied at the composition and conducting faculty of the Saint Petersburg Conservatory. She left the conservatory during her fourth year, in September 2020, without graduating. She initially trained as a pianist before concentrating on composition and music education.

== Career ==
=== Music education and online lectures ===
Vilenskaya taught at the Staccato music school. According to her account, she began teaching groups of adults at 18 and gave her first public lecture at 19. She developed two music-theory courses for PIMA, recorded podcasts for the Saint Petersburg Philharmonia and contributed lectures to Synchronization. In 2021, she was an editor of the Union of Composers of Russia's VKontakte and Telegram pages.

Her public education work included the Music from Within lecture cycle at the Alexandrinsky Theatre. The programme was designed to introduce rhythm, tonality and musical form through examples from classical and popular music. She hosted concerts in the I Am a Composer! programme at Zaryadye and was advertised as the speaker for a 2021 Yeltsin Center talk about chords and musical storytelling in songs by the Beatles.

In August 2021, she moderated the Union of Composers of Russia and Melodiya programme at Russian Creative Week, which included discussions of classical music and cultural projects. In December that year, she presented a webinar for the Institute of Musical Initiatives on changes in musical taste. An article published by the institute in January 2022 described her as the author of more than 100 lectures on classical music.

Vilenskaya established her YouTube channel in 2018 and developed the non-commercial Open Music Lecture Hall. In August 2026, Afisha Daily reported that the channel had more than 300,000 subscribers. Her videos have examined Radiohead, Kino, Zemfira, Morgenshtern, Russian hip hop and film music, alongside classical repertoire.

=== Podcasts and video projects ===
Vilenskaya presented Noise All Around, a podcast associated with the Union of Composers of Russia. Episodes addressed contemporary classical music, neoclassicism, postmodernism, film scores and composers' working lives.

In November 2021, she and Warner Music Russia launched Theory of the Big Banger on the WOW TV YouTube channel. The programme combined interviews with musicians and analysis of popular songs. Its first guest was Eldar Dzharakhov.

In May 2024, she appeared in an episode of YADRO's Dedicated Engineer podcast about mathematical relationships in musical harmony. The Cultural Code project features her The Musical Code of 1990s Russia, a lecture cycle examining the decade through its music.

=== Media appearances ===
In June 2024, she was interviewed by Yury Dud for his YouTube programme vDud. The discussion ranged from Dmitri Shostakovich and Richard Wagner to Face and Taylor Swift.

Interviews published by Latvia's LSM and the UK-based publication Akcent UK in 2025 addressed subjects including K-pop, connections between Muse and Rachmaninoff, and British popular music.

=== International lectures ===
By November 2023, Vilenskaya was living in Tbilisi, Georgia. By 2026, she was living in Austin, Texas. In August 2026, ClassicalMusicNews.ru reported that her lecture-tour itinerary for that year spanned 41 cities.

==== United States and Canada ====
The Hudson Park branch of the New York Public Library advertised her six-part series The Evolution of Russian Music for November and December 2024, covering composers from Mikhail Glinka to Dmitri Shostakovich.

The Kaufman Music Center calendar advertised a lecture by Vilenskaya at Merkin Hall in New York City for 4 November 2024 about Joe Hisaishi's music for the films of Hayao Miyazaki. Rvachev LLC was listed as the presenter.

In January 2025, she gave lectures on Canadian music at the Leah Posluns Theatre in Toronto and the École de musique Vincent-d'Indy in Montreal.

The University of Texas at Austin listed her lecture Shostakovich: Music, Power, and Paradox for 15 September 2025. A lecture titled The Physics of Music, or Why There Are Seven Notes was advertised for 30 September 2025 at the Ruth Stricker Dayton Campus Center in Saint Paul, Minnesota. The campus center belongs to Macalester College.

==== Europe and Central Asia ====
Munich's Gasteig listed an appearance by Vilenskaya at Gasteig HP8 on 17 February 2024, organised by KiViN e.V. Violin House in Limassol, Cyprus, lists her as the guest composer for its 2024 Composer Challenge, themed around space and music.

The official tourism calendar for Astana listed her lecture From Blues to Rock: A Brief History of English-Language Music of the 20th Century for 11 September 2024. During a visit to Tashkent that year, she gave a lecture and appeared on the Tashkent Live Music Session podcast, discussing music by Uzbek performers including Sevara Nazarkhan and Tohir Sodiqov.

== Approach to music education ==
In interviews and educational materials, Vilenskaya has described combining musical analysis with listeners' emotional responses and using familiar popular songs to introduce concepts also applied to classical music, including musical expectation, repetition, harmonic tension and modulation.

In a 2021 interview, she described moving away from humorous anecdotes about composers towards explanations of musical form and tonality. She said that giving non-musicians tools for listening was more useful than relying on composers' biographies.

Reviewing her 2023 lecture on Soviet film music for InterMedia, Alexey Mazhayev described her use of an opening audience exercise, familiar film excerpts and piano demonstrations to explain similarities between melodies. He praised the lecture's accessible presentation.

== Reception ==
In a 2024 review of her vDud interview, InterMedia critic Alexey Mazhayev praised her ability to explain complex musical subjects in accessible language without academic snobbery.

In a 2024 article in the Journal of Popular Music Studies, John David Vandevert described Vilenskaya's 2021 online lecture on Russian hip hop as one of the few attempts at systematic analysis of Russian rap's musical aesthetics and stated that his study originated in her work.

In an opinion article for Snob, critic Anton Serenkov acknowledged Vilenskaya's training and ability to engage audiences but criticised aspects of her analysis of rap, including her treatment of rappers, beatmakers and the creators of sampled recordings. He suggested that her performances would be better described as solo theatrical shows than as lectures.

=== Medieval and Renaissance music course ===
In 2024, Vilenskaya released a seven-lecture course on medieval and Renaissance music through Stradarium, an educational platform created by the team behind Suffering Middle Ages. It addressed early musical notation, compositional techniques and music before Bach.

After promotional excerpts circulated in August 2026, musicologists and early-music performers criticised factual errors and historical inaccuracies. Critics of the course included Moscow Conservatory professor Larisa Kirillina, early-music performer Maria Batova and medieval-music performer Danil Ryabchikov.

Vilenskaya acknowledged mistakes and said that not employing a scholarly editor had been an error. She also said that she did not regard herself as an expert in every subject covered by her lectures, describing her work as sharing analytical tools and a way of thinking about music. She told Afisha Daily that Stradarium would commission specialists to correct the course and that a revised version would be made freely available. In an interview with RBC, she said that she considered the course useful for introducing listeners to early music despite its errors. Journalist Mikhail Kozyrev publicly defended her. In an opinion column for Republic, writer Dmitry Bykov argued that the public-lecture format served purposes beyond factual instruction. Coverage also examined the distinction between factual criticism and personal harassment, and the limits of simplification in public education.

== Awards ==
- 2018 — Cultural award from the Znanie Society.
- 2022 — Included in the music category of the 100-person longlist for the Forbes Russia 30 Under 30 ranking.
