= Ari Babakhanov =

Uzbekistani musician (born 1934)

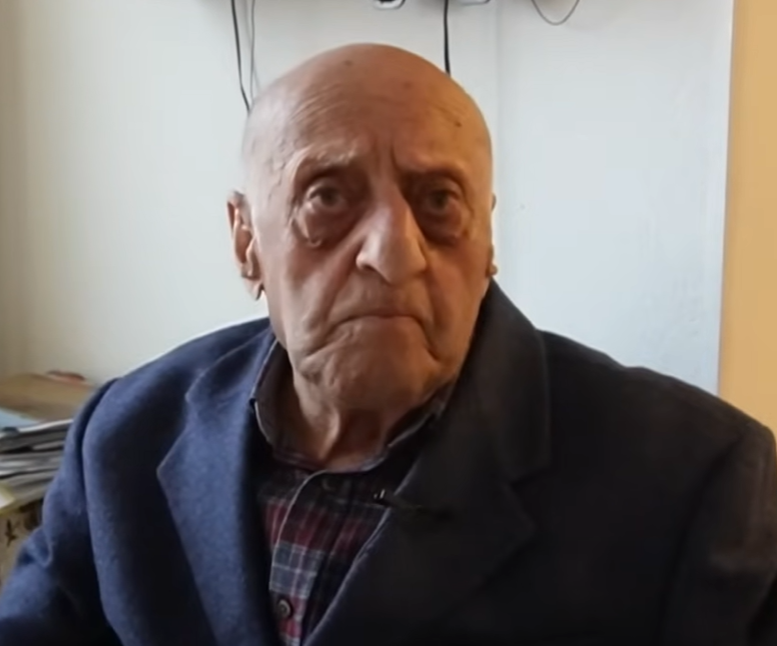
Babakhanov in 2023

Ari Babakhanov (born 1934) is a musician who performs the long-necked lutes tanbur, qashqari rubab and dutar.

== Biography ==
Babakhanov was born in Bukhara into a Jewish family which can look back on an outstanding dynasty of traditional musicians. It was founded by his grandfather Levi Babakhan (1873–1926), the legendary court vocalist of Alim Khan, the last emir of Bukhara. Levi Babakhan's son Moshe Babakhanov (1910–1983) was also a famous vocalist who accompanied himself on tanbur and doira.

In contrary to his grandfather and father Ari Babakhanov became a pure instrumentalist. After his musical studies according to the European curriculum at the Tashkent conservatory he graduated in 1959 with the state examination. Because of the Soviet cultural politics using the customary instruments was still permitted but mainly for a European repertoire. By the discrepancy between the monophonic Uzbek music and the European polyphony these constraints led to an artificial cultural hybrid.

In spite of his artistic successes in Tashkent Ari Babakhanov returned to Bukhara, where he taught for the following 40 years at the music college. With the help of his father and musicians like Maarufjon Tashpulov, Najmiddin Nasriddinov und Aminjon Ismatov he gradually found back to the traditional Bukhara music, the Shashmaqam. He made it his life task to develop this art and achieved a unique contribution for keeping it by writing down an enormous number of notes and texts of Persian Poetry as well as popular Uzbek and Tajik poems. Hereby he revived a series of lost creations which had formerly belonged to the Shashmaqam repertoire. This basis inspired him to compose own instrumental pieces and songs in the traditional style of which several became very popular in Uzbekistan.

In 1991 he founded at the Bukhara Philharmonic Society the Shashmaqam Ensemble which grew within a few years from initially 10 to 19 members. Shortly afterwards the group under the artistic direction of Ari Babakhanov performed for the Uzbek radio and TV and established itself in the traditional music scene. In 1998 their CD Ari Babakhanov & Ensemble - Shashmaqam: The Tradition of Bukhara was published by New Samarkand Records.

Because the Bukharian Jewish community of Central Asia has almost dispersed by migration after Uzbekistan's independence, Ari Babakhanov's family searched for new future perspectives and moved to Germany, where he currently resides.

== Sources ==
In: <Stephan Trudewind, Ari Babakhanov, der Hüter der Musik des "Schaschmaqam" aus Buchara. Der Arabische Almanach - Zeitschrift für orientalische Kultur, 2005/06, 16. Jg., Frank & Frei Verl., Berlin, ISSN 1432-0215>

In: <Alexander Djumaev, Ari Babakhanov & Ensemble - Shashmaqam: The Tradition of Bukhara. CD-booklet, 1999, New Samarkand Records, Amsterdam>
