= Turgun Alimatov =

Uzbek classic music and shashmaqam virtuoso and composer

- Born: Turgun Alimatov; 20 January 1922; Tashkent, Turkestan ASSR
- Died: 17 December 2008 (aged 86) Tashkent, Uzbekistan
- Genres: Classical, Folk, Maqam, Shashmaqam
- Instruments: Dutar, tanbur, sato, violin
- Years active: 1939–2008
- Labels: Ocora, The Alimatovs' Studios
- Website: www.alimatov.com

Turgun Alimatov (Uzbek: Turgʻun Alimatov; 20 January 1922 – 17 December 2008) was a leading Uzbek classic music and shashmaqam player and composer of 20th century folk and classic music. He was a master performer of tanbur, dutar, and sato. He was recognized as People's Artist of Uzbekistan.

The musical community knows Alimatov for being a player of tanbur, dutar, and sato.

He has found a new style and technique of performance on the dutar, sato, and tanbur which became popular around Uzbekistan, and his way of playing in these instruments is followed by many performers.

Alimatov's music is used in many Uzbek houses to put to sleep babies and kids, also in hospitals and treatment centers in Uzbekistan.

== Early life ==
He was born in 1922 in Tashkent and lived there all his life. He came to music of his own volition. From his childhood, Turgun has been learnt playing dutar by his talented father. Although his father didn't teach him how to play the dutar, he allowed him to take the dutar and play whatever he wanted. Aside from his father's dutar playing he listened to other musicians and remembered their melodies and rhythms.

Turgun became inspired by endlessly repeating their music without copying them exactly. He considered that his principal teacher to be his hearing ability, good memory, and his heart.

Alimatov never studied in a special music school and remained one of the musicians who learned how to play traditional instruments without taking any direct lessons and formal education in music.

== Life and work ==
His career as a musician began in 1939, when he was 17, and was connected to musical theatre, and chiefly to Uzbek radio. Working without a teacher, he developed his own style and technique on the dutar and other instruments.

Although many older masters listening to him believed he played incorrectly, his compositions became popular on the radio and listeners liked the simplicity and sincerity of his music.

"If I had a teacher, then I might hate the music, because I would have been embarrassed to play the dutar for a teacher" he said.

After finishing the tenth grade, he joined Theater of Young Audiences where he found a job as a violinist. At the same time, he became an instructor and directed his own amateur music society as the supplementary activity. Turgun Alimatov worked and performed in the Theatre of Young Audiences until the beginning of World War II. In 1941, he resigned and was sent to the military front.

After one year in the Second World War, in August 1942, he was wounded in the leg and evacuated to a hospital in Siberia, and then back to Tashkent. While he was recuperating, he knew that the Muqimi Theatre of Musical Drama, the largest and the most popular Theatre in Uzbekistan announced a competition for musicians and singers, whose winners would be freed from duty at the front. Turgun Alimatov entered the competition and won a place in the theater's music ensemble.

Then, the performer has worked at the Republican Radio as a leading tanbur player in national and instrumental ensemble headed by Yunus Rajabiy. From 1985 until the end of his life, Turgun Alimatov worked at Tashkent State Conservatory as honorable professor.

From 1991, he started his solo tour programs in US, UK, Germany, and France becoming the first Uzbek musician by his solo concerts abroad. His art and creative work has not until now been the subject of studies by ethnomusicologists.

In 1991, Turgun Alimatov was awarded as the People's Artist of Uzbekistan, one year later in 1992, he received the Order of The Great Contribution.

Turgun Alimatov played for himself and always played the songs he wanted to perform, simply because he enjoyed playing. He didn't prepare himself for the life of professional musician and never followed the music career. Music for him was not a profession.

On December 17, 2008, Turgun Alimatov died at the age of 86 remaining one of the best and successful musicians in world music history.

== Discography ==
- Ouzbekistan (1995)
- The great 1960s and 80s (1960, 1970, 1980)
- Turgun Alimatov 1 CD(s) - Label : Ocora - Distributor : Harmonia Mundi (01/1996)
