= Abdurahim Hamidov =

Uzbekistani lutenist

Abdurahim Hamidov (1952, Tashkent, Uzbekistan – 2013, United States) was an Uzbekistani lutenist. He was a master musician of the long-necked lutes tanbur, qashqari rubab and dutar. He was particularly known for playing lively, modern virtuosic melodies.

== Biography ==
Born in Tashkent, Hamidov was born into a family of merchants. Both his father and grandfather were educated religious man in the Islamic faith and achieved the title of mullah. He began studying music seriously at the age of six and began studies on the rubab at the age of seven. Two years later he began pursuing studies on the dutar. After achieving fame in his own country in his youth, he became internationally known on the world music scene; notably recording the album The Masters Of The Dotâr with VDE-Gallo Records in Switzerland in 1993. Due to the political situation in his country, he lived the latter years of his life in exile in the United States.
