= Bolalar =

Uzbekistani pop rock band

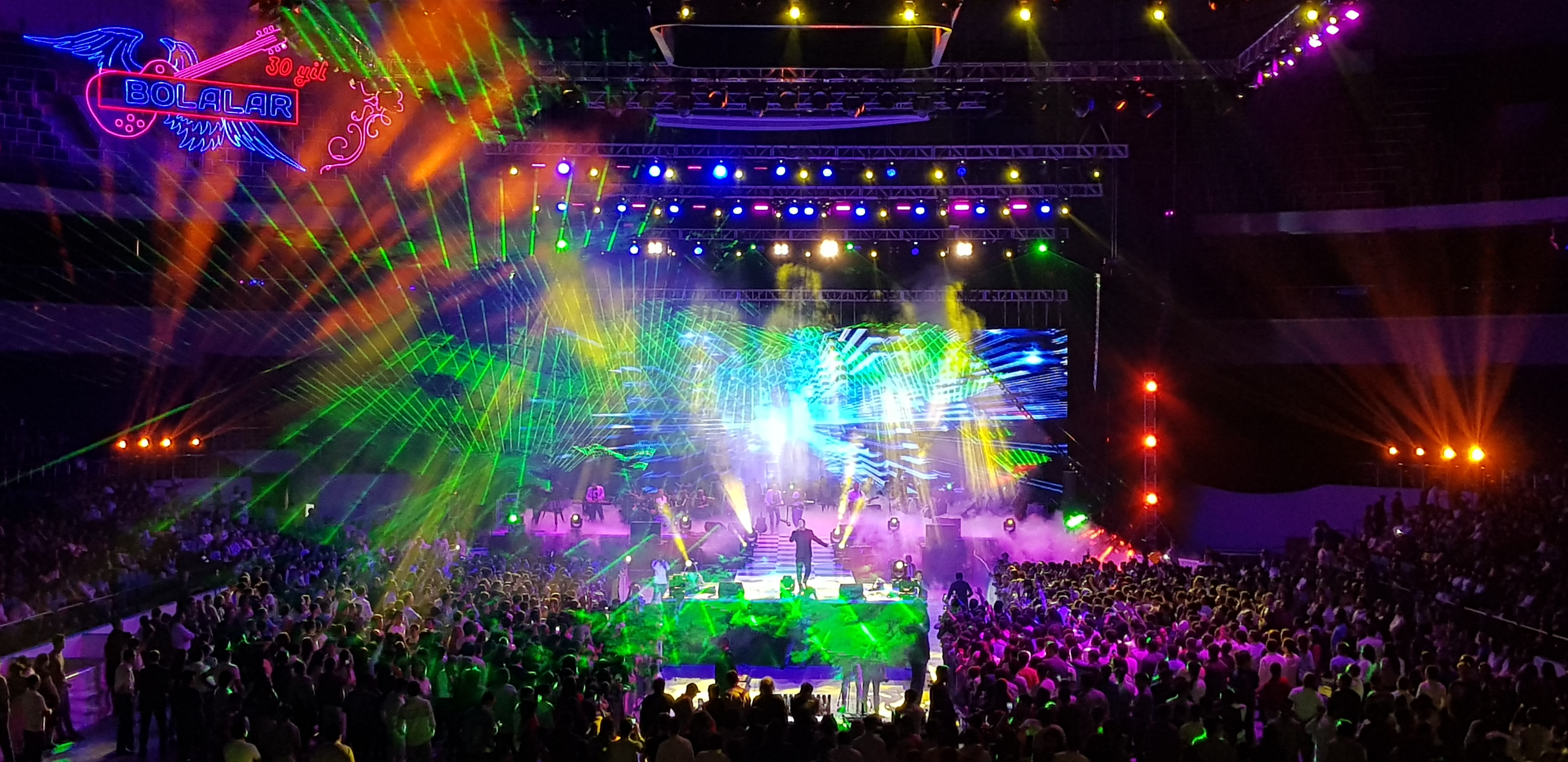
- Bolalar performing during Bolalar Show 2019, the anniversary concert in recognition of their 30 years as a band

Background information
- Origin: Tashkent, Uzbekistan
- Genres: Rock, pop
- Years active: 1989–present
- Labels: Tarona Records; Kelajak Records
- Members: Tohir Sodiqov; Husan Sodiqov; Timur G'aynutdinov; Baxtiyor Nurmatov; Vagif Zokirov; Tofik Morduxayev
- Past members: Javohir Zokirov; Nargiz Zakirova; Bahodir Poʻlatov; Ravshan Sobirov; Anvar Salohddinov; Tolib Quliyev; Rustam Zohidov; Vladimir Petrachenkov; Toir Odilov; Ruslan Sharipov

Bolalar are an Uzbek pop-rock band formed in 1989 by Tohir Sodiqov, Husan Sodiqov co-composer and lyricist, Bahodir Poʻlatov, Javohir Zokirov, and Ruslan Sharipov. The band currently consists of members Tohir Sodiqov (lead vocals, rhythm guitar), Timur Gaynutdinov (lead guitar), Baxtiyor Nurmatov (bass guitar), Tofik Morduxayev (drums), and Vagif Zokirov (keyboard, composing, arrangement). The name of the band, "Bolalar," means "children" or "boys" in Uzbek. It also means "guys" in Uzbek slang.

Bolalar have received several awards and nominations throughout their career. In 2001, the band won a Tarona, an accolade given to recognize outstanding achievement in the music industry of Uzbekistan, for Best Song. Bolalar also received the Tarona Award for Best Band in 2001 and 2002. Tohir Sodiqov, the long-time lead singer, occasional guitarist, songwriter and composer of Bolalar, is a Meritorious Artist of Uzbekistan. Tohir's Sodiqov's older brother Husan Sodiqov wrote or co-wrote most of the songs included in the band's earlier albums, such as the hit songs "Esingdami seni?", "Bolalar", and "Nega unday qilding sen?"

Bolalar and the Russian band Laskoviy Mai, who were an early influence on Bolalar, have often been called "the legends of the 1990s." Bolalar are among the few Central Asian bands to have given concerts in the United States and to have released albums on iTunes.

== History ==
"Bolalar"
Sample of the 1998 remix of "Bolalar." The song became an immediate hit in Uzbekistan upon its release in 1989.

Tohir Sodiqov and his friends Bahodir Poʻlatov, Javohir Zokirov, and Ruslan Sharipov, who all went to Secondary School No. 41 in Tashkent, founded the band in 1989. They gained popularity in Uzbekistan after their first hit, "Bolalar", in 1989. Bolalar originally consisted of Bahodir Poʻlatov, Husan Sodiqov (Tohir Sodiqov's brother), Javohir Zokirov, Nargiz Zokirova, Ruslan Sharipov, Tofik Morduxayev, Toir Odilov, and Tohir Sodiqov.

Bolalar performed to a large audience for the first time in February 1990. In December 1989, they recorded their debut album, Esingdami seni? (Do You Remember?), which was released in January 1990. The group's artistic director and composer was originally Ruslan Sharipov. Over the years, most of the original members left the band. The remaining band members occasionally perform together. Tohir Sodiqov has launched a successful solo career. He usually writes both the music and lyrics to his songs.

== Musical style and influences ==
Bolalar's musical style has generally been characterized as pop rock. However, they have experimented with different musical styles throughout their career.

The band members were influenced by the Uzbek rock and roll singer Davron Gaipov and the then-popular Russian band Laskoviy Mai. Tohir Sodiqov and Yuri Shatunov, the lead singer of Laskoviy Mai, performed together in Tashkent in 2009.

== Discography ==
"Boʻldi xato"
Sample of "Boʻldi xato." "Boʻldi xato" is one of the most famous Bolalar songs.

Bolalar released their first album, Esingdami seni? (Do You Remember?), in January 1990. On January 22, 2007, the band released their album The Very Best of the Fontana Years on iTunes.

To date, Tohir Sodiqov and Bolalar have released over 280 songs, 28 albums, and a dozen music videos. Sodiqov has launched a successful solo career. Still, the band members occasionally perform together.

=== Music videos ===
| Year | Title | Director |
|---|---|---|
| 1989 | "Esingdami seni?" | |
| 1989 | "Тебя я не забуду (Школьный вальс)" | |
| 1991 | "Iliq oydim oqshomda" | |
| 1992 | "Yoshligimda" | |
| 1997 | "Sevgi yosh tanlamas" | |
| 1998 | "Gulim" | |
| 1999 | "Faqat isming" | |
| 2001 | "Kerak emas" (Davron Gaipov cover) | |
| 2001 | "Sen ketgan kundan" | |
| 2003 | "Boʻldi xato" | |
| 2004 | "Undan nimam kam?" (feat. Lola Yoʻldosheva) | |
| 2004 | "Koʻzing maʼyus" | |
| 2004 | "Axir u sevmaydi" | |
| 2005 | "Oʻzbek" | Rustam Saʼdiyev |
| 2006 | "Oyijon" | |
| 2006 | "Ana endi yigʻla" | |
| 2006 | "Sogʻinganda" | Mirtohir Mirgʻulomov and Akmal Oʻrinboyev |
| 2007 | "Jazo" | |
| 2007 | "Eski shahar" (feat. Ruslan Sharipov, Shahzod and Xoʻja) | |
| 2008 | "Afsus" | |
| 2008 | "Happy New Year" | |
| 2008 | "Sevgi" | |
| 2008 | "Kechir meni" | Dilmurod Agzamov |
| 2009 | "Yarmimsan" | |
| 2009 | "Mumkin emas" (feat. Sayatash) | |
| 2009 | "Bilsang edi" | |
| 2010 | "Sevaman" | Botir Mamatullayev |
| 2011 | "Mening doʻstim" | |
| 2011 | "Orzu va qaygʻu" | |
| 2011 | "Sevgim soʻndi" | |
| 2014 | "Девочка магнит" | |
| 2019 | "Yomgʻirlar" (feat. Renat Sobirov) | |

=== Musical collaborations ===
- "Barglar" – with the band Fayod (Raʼno Said)
- "Bagʻishlov" – with Ruslan Sharipov
- "Dilbarim" – with Sardor Rahimxon and Ulugʻbek Rahmatullayev
- "Eski shahar" – with Ruslan Sharipov, Xoʻja (Izzat Ibragimov), Shahzod (Rashid Xoliqov)
- "Indamay" – with Rayhon
- "Men, sen" – with the band Asr (Abdulaziz Karim)
- "Mumkin emas" – with Sayatash
- "Tinch qoʻy" – with Malika
- "Undan nimam kam?" – with Lola Yuldasheva
- "Yaralangan yurak" – with Sayatash
- "Yomgʻirlar" – with Renat Sobirov
- "Yogʻsin yomgʻir tonggacha" – with Setora (Feruza Latipova, Laylo Galiyeva, Kamilla Xoʻjayeva)
- "Первая любовь" – with Davron Davurov
- "Я встретил девушку" – with DJ Piligrim (Ilhom Yoʻlchiyev)

== Awards and accolades ==
"Unutganim yoʻq"
Sample of "Unutganim yoʻq." Expressive guitar accompaniments are a distinguishing feature of Bolalar songs.

Bolalar have received several awards and nominations throughout their career. In 2001, the band won a Tarona, an accolade given to recognize outstanding achievement in the music industry of Uzbekistan, for Best Song for their song "Kerak emas." Bolalar also received the Tarona Award for Best Band in 2001 and 2002.

Tohir Sodiqov, the long-time lead singer of Bolalar, is a Meritorious Artist of Uzbekistan. Bolalar are among the few Central Asian bands to have given concerts in the United States and to have released albums on iTunes.
