= Haj Qorban Soleimani =

Background information
- Born: April 11, 1920; Quchan
- Died: January 20, 2008 (aged 87)
- Genres: Persian music
- Occupations: Musician, vocalist
- Instrument: dotar

Haj Qorban Soleimani (Persian: حاج قربان سلیمانی) (April 11, 1920 – January 20, 2008) was an Iranian celebrated dotar player and vocalist. Dotar or Dutar is a form of Central Asian lute.

== Biography ==
Soleimani was born in 1920 to Khorasani Turkic parents in Aliabad (علی‌آباد) village in the northern part of Qouchan in northeastern Iran. His father, Karbalaii Ramezan, an accomplished musician taught him the dotar from a young age. Following his father's death he continued learning the dotar and sought singing lessons from singers such as Avaz Bakhshi, Gholamhossein Bakhshi Jafarabadi and Mohammad Qeitaqi. By his early twenties he had mastered the traditional Iranian instrument, the dotar, and at the age of 21 he received the coveted 'Bakhshi' title, given to people of musical excellence in Khorasan province.

Soleimani once spoke about the award; "In the Khorasan region 'Bakhshi' is the title given to a musician who is perfect. He must be able to compose, sing, play, make musical instruments and even know stories and narrate tales. One can hardly find any such artists these days."

Soleimani sang in the three languages spoken in Khorasan province, namely Persian, Turkic.

Throughout his career he participated in many international concerts and venues, but was more popular in France than anywhere else where he believed his music was more appreciated. Soleimani often spoke out about his perceived distinct lack of following in his native country which disappointed him, once saying "Non-Iranian nations especially the French know me better than my fellow countrymen since they have a passion for art and music." He also performed notably at the Festival of Iranian Arts in Düsseldorf, Germany.

In 1990, Qorban Soleimani was accoladed "Best and Most Authentic Musician Award" by the Festival of Revolutionary Songs and Music. In 1991, he received the honorary title “Real National Treasure" at a music festival held in Avignon, France.

== Death ==
He died in his village of birth Aliabad, of pneumonia on Sunday January 20, 2008, aged 87 according to the Tehran Times, although other sources have falsely reported that he was 85 at time of death.

His body was buried in the village the following day on January 21 and his funeral was attended by numerous famous artists and cultural officials in the region.

Qorban is survived by 14 children, and his son, aged 50 (as of January 2008) Alireza had performed with his father on numerous occasions. Two of Soleimani's daughters have also become musicians.

== See also ==
- Music of Iran
- List of Iranian musicians
