= Lola (singer) =

Uzbek singer-songwriter and actress

Lola Лола
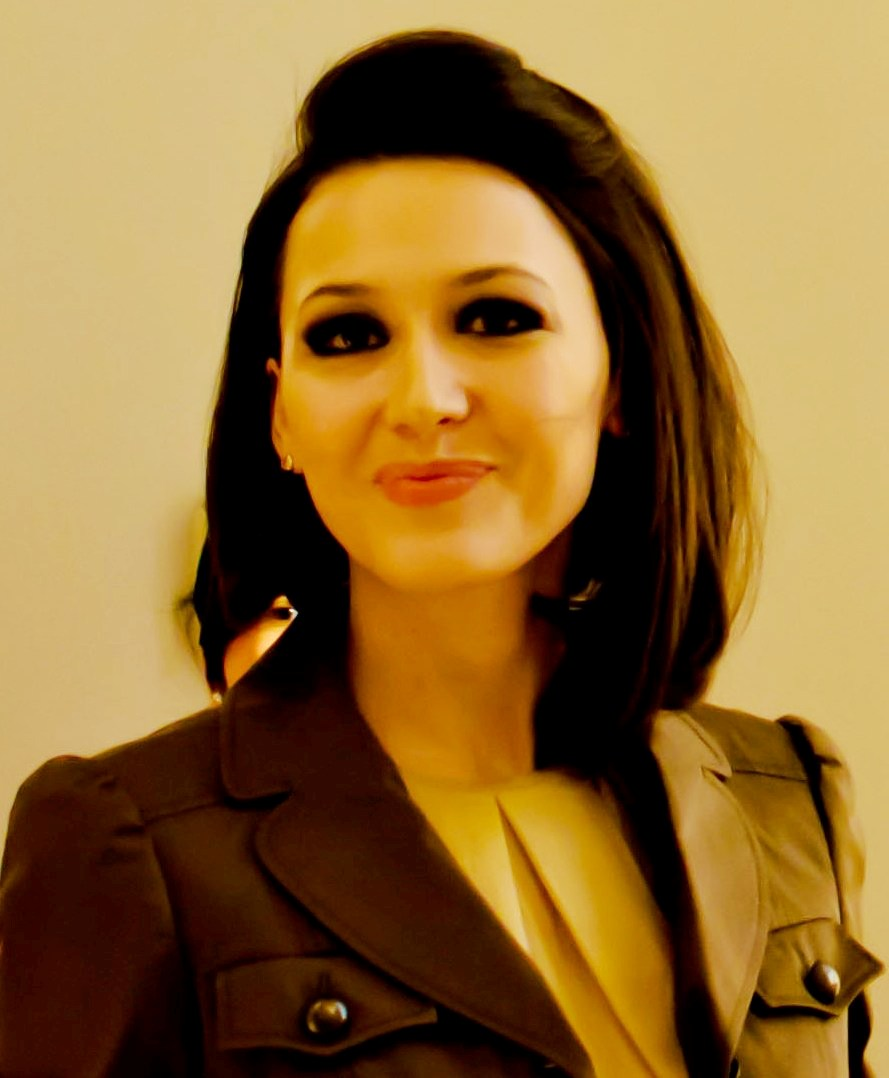
- Lola in 2012

Background information
- Born: Lola Yoʻldosheva; 4 September 1985 (age 41)
- Origin: Samarkand, Uzbek SSR, USSR
- Genres: Pop; Pop-rock
- Occupations: singer, songwriter, and film actress
- Years active: 1999–present
- Label: Tarona

Lola Yoʻldosheva (sometimes spelled Lola Yuldasheva in English) (Uzbek: Lola Yoʻldosheva, Лола Йўлдошева) (born September 4, 1985), better known simply as Lola, is an Uzbek singer, songwriter and film actress. She rose to prominence in Uzbekistan with her song "Muhabbatim" ("My Love") in 2003. Lola has recorded songs both in Uzbek and Russian.

Lola's first studio movie appearance was in the 2004 Uzbek film Sevinch. She received positive reviews for her performance in the film both from movie critics and fans. Her acting career reached a new high as a result of her starring role in the 2005 comedy Kelgindi kuyov ("The Alien Bridegroom"). Since then she has acted in several Uzbek movies.

In 2005, Lola got married and went on an indefinite hiatus, but returned to show business in 2011 with a series of solo concerts. In 2015, she was given a warning by Uzbeknavo, Uzbekistan's government agency that issues licenses to performers, for wearing a red low-back dress that “conflicts with the national mentality” while performing a duet with Rayhon. This controversy led to the suspension of Lola's license by Uzbeknavo in July 2015. In November 2019, Lola released a music video for her single "Sevgingni menga ayt" (Tell Me About Your Love) in which she criticized censorship of singers and musicians in Uzbekistan. The video, which was directed by Lola herself, went viral and was hailed as a "social protest" and "revolutionary" by many critics and fans.

== Life ==
Lola Yoʻldosheva was born on September 4, 1985, in Samarkand to Ravshanbek Yoʻldoshev, the founder of the record label Tarona Records, and Gulnara Yoʻldosheva. She has two younger sisters, Anora and Asal, and a younger brother, Rustam. Shahzoda's son Halid is her step-brother.

After graduating from high school, she moved to Moscow to attend Moscow International University. Following her graduation, she returned to Tashkent and began attending Westminster International University in Tashkent to pursue a business degree. She later transferred to Tashkent State University of Law, where she graduated with a law degree.

In 2005, Lola married Shohruh, a businessman from Tashkent. They have two children: Shahinabegim and Shohdiyor. The couple divorced in 2011.

== Career ==
Lola initially performed under the stage name of Maya and sang mostly in Russian. She rose to prominence in Uzbekistan with her song "Muhabbatim" ("My Love") in 2003. In October 2005, Lola got married and went on an indefinite hiatus, but returned to show business in November 2011 with a series of solo concerts entitled "Senga" ("For You").

Lola made her film debut in the 2004 Uzbek film Sevinch. The film did well in theaters and Lola received positive reviews for her portrayal of a girl with cancer. Her song "Orzu" was among the songs included in the soundtrack for the movie.

Lola became highly popular within the Uzbek film industry in 2005 with her leading role in the popular comedy Kelgindi kuyov (The Alien Bridegroom). Since then she has acted in several films.

=== 2015 controversy ===
Lola was given a warning by Uzbeknavo, Uzbekistan's government agency that issues licenses to performers, for wearing a red low-back dress that “conflicts with the national mentality” while performing the song "Koʻnikmadim" with Rayhon at the latter's concert on 24 February 2015.

In March 2015, Uzbeknavo issued a directive that female singers were no longer to wear clothing that exposed their shoulders or legs, that they were not to appear “half-naked” at public events, and that they were not to include any sexually suggestive moves on stage. Deputy Prime Minister and chairperson of Uzbekistanʼs State Women’s Committee Elmira Bositkhonova was quoted as saying “How can one explain the fact that some of our female singers are dressed in a more than revealing style, completely divorced from the national style, and appear on television channels intended for family viewing, singing songs with messages that aren’t subjected to any criticism and in frivolous video clips?” Following Bositkhonova's remarks, Uzbeknavo suspended Lolaʼs license on 14 July 2015.

=== 2019 censorship video ===
In November 2019, Lola released a second music video for her single "Sevgingni menga ayt" (Tell Me About Your Love) in her personal YouTube channel in which she criticized censorship of singers and musicians in Uzbekistan. The video, which was directed by Lola herself, went viral and was hailed as a "social protest" and "revolutionary" by many critics and fans, including the well-known Uzbek director Ali Hamroyev. Uzbek government officials, however, criticized the music video, saying that "all clips, all music and songs must adhere to the Uzbek mentality." In 2020, the singer temporarily wiped her YouTube channel along with all of her videos. The channel has been restored since.

== Discography ==
=== Studio albums ===
"Muhabbatim"
Sample of "Muhabbatim." The song became an immediate hit in Uzbekistan upon its release in 2003.

Lola has released 9 studio albums to date.

- Netayin? (2002)
- Muhabbatim (2004)
- Topdim baxtimni (2005)
- Imkon ber (2010)
- Senga (2011)
- Sogʻindim (2012)
- Kel (2014)
- Bilmaysan (2016)
- Qaytmayman (2018)

=== Compilation albums ===
- Megamix (2016)

=== Music videos ===
Year	Title	Director
1999	"Shiribum"	
1999	"Bahor"	
2001	"Потерялись"	
2002	"Отпусти"	
2002	"Netayin?"	
2004	"Muhabbatim"	Ice TIM (Temur Qodirov)
2004	"Orzu"	Ice TIM (Temur Qodirov)
2004	"Qachon?"	
2004	"Sehrgar"	
2004	"Toshkent-Samarqand"	
2004	"Tugʻilgan kun"	Ice TIM (Temur Qodirov)
2004	"Undan ninmam kam?" (featuring Bolalar)	
2004	"Xayr, opajonim"	
2005	"Ichim yonar"	
2005	"Qizginam" (featuring Ismoil Jalilov and Nasiba Abdullayeva)	
2005	"Sevgilim"	
2005	"Sogʻinch"	
2005	"Topdim baxtimni"	
2005	"Yuragim"	
2006	"Koʻz yoshim"	Bahodir Yoʻldoshev
2006	"Qolaymi"	
2006	"Chin muhabbat"	
2010	"Baxt bor"	
2010	"Imkon ber"	
2010	"Qiynalar qalbim"	
2011	"Asta"	
2011	"Senga"	
2012	"Nega?"	
2012	"Aylanma"	
2012	"Endi yoʻq"	
2012	"Jonim sogʻindim"	
2012	"Qaytmaydi"	Muhammad Ali Iskandarov
2012	"Yomonlama"	
2013	"Endi yoʻq" (Remix)	Yodgor Nosirov
2013	"Kel"	Yodgor Nosirov
2013	"Love Me"	Yodgor Nosirov
2013	"Yigʻlar osmon" (featuring Shohruhxon)	
2014	"Super Love"	
2014	"Jonim ayt"	Yodgor Nosirov
2014	"Yulduz" (featuring DJ Piligrim)	Jasur Shametov
2014	"Farhod va Shirin"	
2015	"Imagine" (John Lennon cover) (featuring DJ Piligrim)	Timur Primkulov
2015	"Koʻnikmadim" (featuring Rayhon)	Jasur Shametov
2015	"Sevgimsan"	Yodgor Nosirov
2015	"Xayr"	Timur Primkulov
2015	"Ottsveli khrizantemy" (Отцвели хризантемы)	
2015	"Yaralangan qanot"	Sarvar Azimov
2015	"Sevgimsan" (Alternative version)	
2016	"Sogʻindim"	Sanjar Matkarimov
2016	"Я вода"	Timur Primkulov
2016	"Erkatoy"	Sanjar Matkarimov, Narimon Sultonxoʻjayev
2016	"Xabar ol"	Sanjar Matkarimov, Mansur Vasati
2016	"Bilmaysan"	Sanjar Matkarimov, Rustam Murodov
2017	"Hayot davom etar" (featuring Rashid Xoliqov)	
2019	"Qaytmayman"	
2019	"Sevgingni menga ayt"	
2019	"Sevgingni menga ayt 2"	Lola Yoʻldosheva
2024	"Sogʻinch"	
2025	"Aldamadim"	
2025	"Oʻzicha"	

== Filmography ==
=== Actress ===
Film
Year	Film	Role	Notes
1999	Navroʻz ayyomi	Herself	Musical
2004	Sevinch	Sevinch	
2005	Kelgindi kuyov	Zaynab	
2006	Voy dod sumalak	Herself	Musical
2006	Yarim baxt	Komila	
2011	Jodugar	Ruhshona	
2011	Yondiradi, kuydiradi	Lola	
2011	Gʻaroyib orzular	Herself	Musical
2014	Bu telba muhabbat yoxud Farhod va Shirin	Shirin	
2016	Taqdir hazili	Herself	Musical
2019	Goʻdak nolasi		

Television
Year	Title	Role	Notes
2010	Mehribonginam	Herself	Cameo

Music videos
Year	Title	Artist
2006	"Oyijon"	Tohir Sodiqov

=== Screenwriter ===
Film
Year	Film	Notes
2019	Goʻdak nolasi	

== Awards ==
Lola has received several awards throughout her career. She received a Tarona Award, an accolade given to recognize outstanding achievement in the music industry of Uzbekistan, for Best Stage Outfit in 2004. She won the same award in 2005. Lola won another Tarona for Best Female Singer in 2005.

=== Berlin Music Video Awards ===
The Berlin Music Video Awards is an international festival that promotes the art of music videos. For the 2026 edition Lola is nominated for the Best Concept category with her music video "O'zicha". The results are still pending.
