= Tohir Sodiqov =

Uzbek singer-songwriter and actor

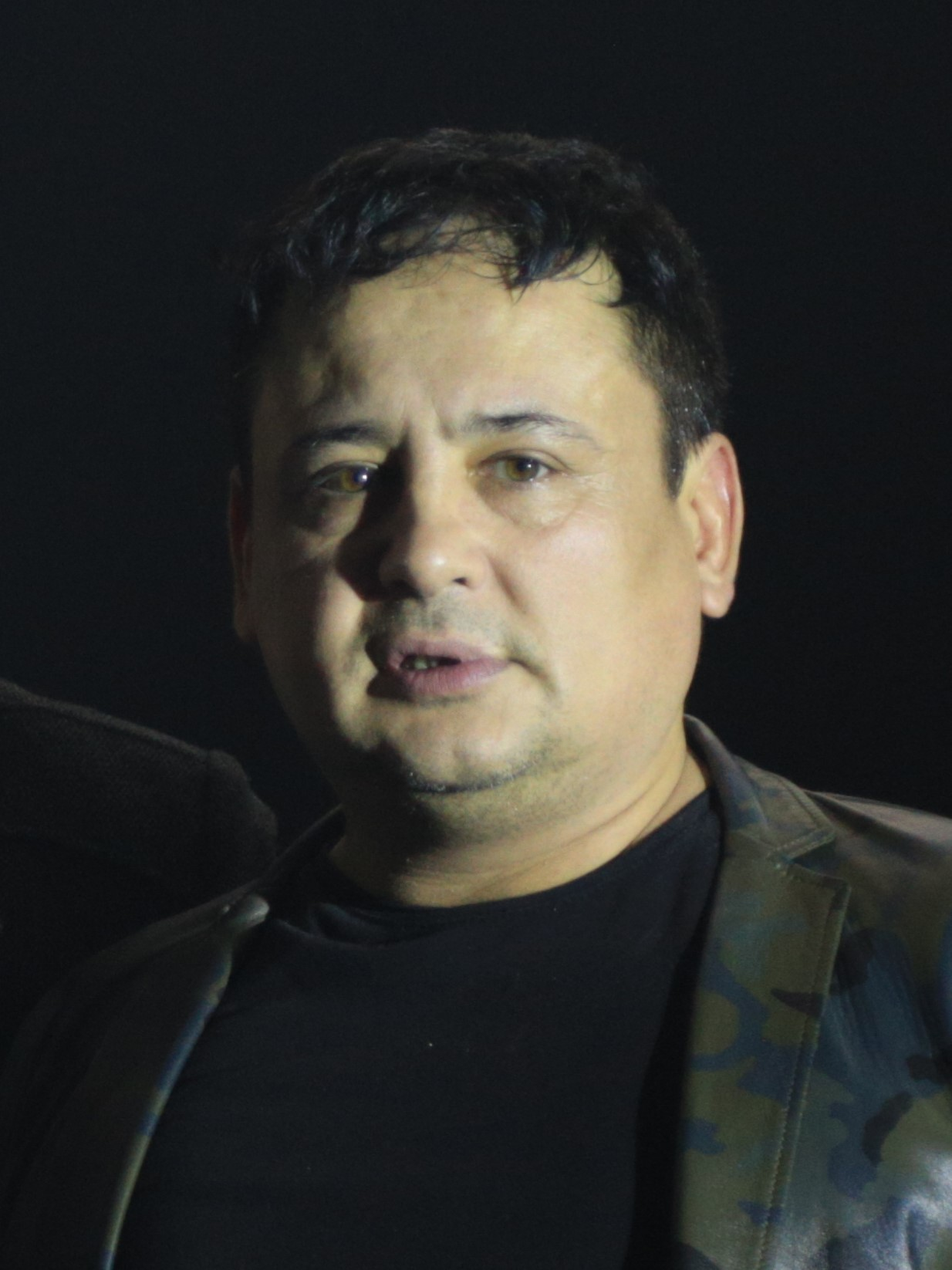
- Tohir Sodiqov in 2018

Background information
- Born: Sodikov Tokhir Bakhromzhonovich; July 1, 1973 (age 52); Tashkent, Uzbek SSR, USSR
- Genres: Pop rock; experimental rock
- Occupations: Singer-songwriter; actor
- Instruments: Vocals; guitar
- Years active: 1989–present
- Labels: Tarona, Kelajak
- Member of: Bolalar
- Awards: Meritorious Artist of Uzbekistan; Order of Mehnat Shuhrati (2026)

Tohir Sodiqov (sometimes spelled Tokhir Sodikov in English) (Uzbek: Tohir Sodiqov / Тоҳир Содиқов) (born July 1, 1973) is an Uzbek singer-songwriter and actor. He is best known as the long-time lead singer, guitarist, and songwriter of the Uzbek rock band Bolalar. Sodiqov has also established a successful solo career. He has recorded songs in Uzbek, Russian, and English.

Sodiqov has received dozens of awards and nominations, including the title Meritorious Artist of Uzbekistan. He is one of the few Central Asian artists to have given concerts in the US and to have released albums on iTunes.

== Personal life ==
Tohir Sodiqov was born in Tashkent on July 1, 1973. His father, Sodiqov Bahromjon Sobirovich, was a retired officer and died when Sodiqov was a child. His mother, Sodiqova Gulnur Mansurovna, raised him as a single parent. Sodiqov attended Secondary School No. 41 in Tashkent from 1980 to 1990. He is married and has three children, two daughters and a son.

== Music career ==
Tohir Sodiqov had no formal music training. He started to play music when he was in high-school. Sodiqov and his friends Ruslan Sharipov, Bahodir Poʻlatov, and Javohir Zokirov, all of whom went to High School No. 41 in Tashkent, founded the band Bolalar in 1989.

== Bolalar ==
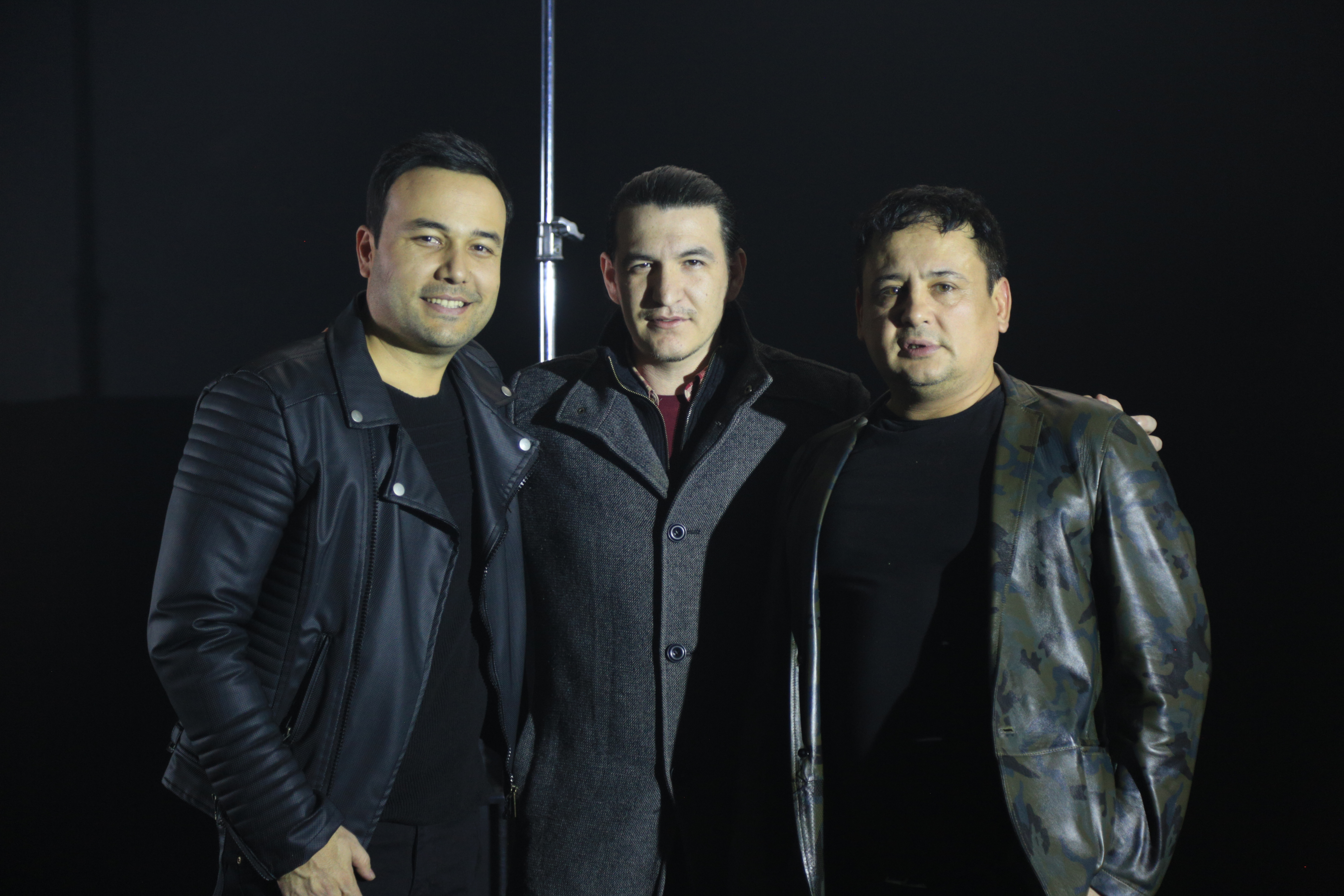
Tohir Soqidov (right) and Renat Sobirov (left) on the set of their new music video on November 23, 2018, in Tashkent, Uzbekistan.

Bolalar originally consisted of Bahodir Poʻlatov, Husan Sodiqov (Tohir Sodiqov's elder brother), Javohir Zokirov, Nargiza Zokirova, Ruslan Sharipov, Tofik Marduxayev, Toir Odilov, and Tohir Sodiqov. The band became widely popular in Uzbekistan with their song "Bolalar" in 1989.

Bolalar recorded their first album, Esingdami seni? (Do You Remember?), in January 1990. Initially, the group's artistic director and composer was Ruslan Sharipov. Over the years all of the original members left the band one after another. Currently, Tohir Sodiqov and Tofik Marduxayev are the only remaining original members.

Tohir Sodiqov usually writes both the music and lyrics to his songs. His music has been associated mostly with pop rock and experimental rock. The members of Bolalar were influenced by the Uzbek rock and roll singer Davron Gaipov and the then-popular Russian band Laskoviy Mai. Bolalar and Laskoviy Mai have often been called "the legends of the 1990s." Tohir Sodiqov and Yuri Shatunov, the lead singer of Laskoviy Mai, performed together in Tashkent in 2009.

== Acting ==
Tohir Sodiqov has acted in half a dozen Uzbek films, most notably in Tohir va Zuhra: Yangi talqin (Tohir and Zuhra: A New Interpretation) (2000) and Koʻzlaring maʼyus (Your Eyes are Sad) (2005).

=== Filmography ===
Film
Year	Title	Role	Notes
1999	Navroʻz ayyomi (Nowruz Day)	Himself	Musical
2000	Tohir va Zuhra yangi talqin (Tohir and Zuhra: A New Interpretation)	Tohir	Musical
2005	Koʻzlaring maʼyus (Your Eyes are Sad)	Sardor	
2006	Voy dod sumalak (Damn, Samanu)	Tohir	Musical
2007	Jazo (Punishment)	Himself	Uncredited cameo
2010	Ada emas, dada! Tohir va Zuhra 2 yangi talqin (Tohir and Zuhra 2: A New Interpretation)	Tohir	Musical
2017	Bolalar	Himself	Documentary

Music videos
Year	Song title	Artist
2000	"Sevgilim"	Yulduz Usmanova ft. Ruslan Sharipov
2001	"Nozanin"	Yulduz Usmanova ft. Ruslan Sharipov
2006	"Qolaymi, ketaymi?"	Lola Yuldasheva

== Awards ==
Tohir Sodiqov has won dozens of awards and nominations, including the title Meritorious Artist of Uzbekistan and Order of Mehnat Shuhrati. He has also received Nihol and Tarona awards. He is one of the few Central Asian artists to have given concerts in the US and to have released albums on iTunes.
