= VDE-Gallo Records =

- Distributor(s): VDE-GALLO Records; Special distributors for the Benelux, France, Germany, Italy, Portugal, South Korea, Spain, Taiwan, and the US.
- Genre: World, Classical
- Country of origin: Switzerland
- Official website: http://www.vdegallo.ch/

VDE-Gallo Records is a small record label, based in Bioley-Magnoux, near Lausanne, Switzerland. It specializes in world music and classical music.

Based in 1964, VDE (Voix dans l’Eglise, «Voices in the Church »)-GALLO is a little Swiss company specialized in the recording, the production and the distribution of records, cassettes, CDs, and from now on also the dematerialized distribution. She realized till now approximately 1500 productions, in very diverse domains, particularly in classical music (with hundreds of first releases) and ethnic-world music (in association with MEG – Museum of ethnography of Geneva).

She received repeatedly international Grand Prix Charles Cros, as well as many other distinctions.

Music publisher «Lausanne-Musique» depends on VDE-GALLO and manages works published in the form of scores and especially in the form of recordings.

General partnership in her early stages, then company in proper noun, VDE-GALLO is going to evolve in Sàrl in 2021, to assure better the continuity of its activity.

In 2017, she also resumed the mark and a part of the catalog of prestigious label Cascavelle.

VDE-GALLO is a member of the SUISA, IFPI, SWISSPERFORM, ASMP and SVMV.

== See also ==
- List of record labels
