= HAVAS guruhi =

Uzbekistani musical group

HAVAS guruhi, meaning Admiration, is an Uzbekistani music group composed of seven members of the Ermatov family who are popularly known for singing Indian songs. The group was founded by a couple, Rustam and his wife Matluba, who are the director and producer of the group respectively. The singers and musicians of the band are their four children. The eldest child, a son named Khakhramon is the winner of Uzbekistan's Nihol award. The second child is a daughter named Shakhnoza. The third child is a son named Dostonbek. The fourth and youngest child is a daughter named Robiya. Nilufar, the wife of eldest son Khakhramon, is a former TV anchor and the present public relations officer of their band.

They are winners of several international contests. They held their first Bollywood concert in Uzbekistan in 2017, and this was a big success. They have performed in several Indian cities and sung in many Indian languages. They also participated in the first season of StarPlus's music show Dil Hai Hindustani.

== Founding of group ==
The group was founded in 2010. It is led by the director and producer couple Ermatov Rustamjon Gulomjonovich (Rustam) and his wife Ermatova Matluba Murotkhojaevna (Matluba). Rustam is the group leader and director. His wife Matluba, a graduate in child psychology, is the producer who also manages her family's large textile business. Their son Gulomjonov Khakhramon (Khakhramon) and daughter Gulomjanova Shakhnoza (Shakhnoza) are singers. Khakhramon, the winner of the Nihol national award, awarded by the president for excellence in music, is the lead singer, composer, and keyboard player. Singer Shahnoza is also a keyboard player and painter. Rustam and Matluba's younger son Gulomjanov Dostonbek (Dostonbek) and multiple awards winning youngest daughter Gulomjanova Robiyakhon (Robiya) are also singers and violinists in the band. Robiya has been singing in concerts since the age of 6 years. The eldest child of the founder couple, Khakhramon - the lead singer, was 25 years old as of January 2019.

Indian music is popular in Uzbekistan, and Bollywood actors and singers, such as Raj Kapoor, Shahrukh Khan, Sonu Nigam, Shreya Ghosal, and Arijit Singh, have large fan followings in Uzbekistan. The founding couple both love listening to the songs of legendary Indian actor Raj Kapoor, which also inspired their children to take up singing Indian songs. Since the family does not understand any Indian languages, Kakhramon initially had difficulty in singing Indian songs. Once he grasped the emotions, after searching the lyrics on the internet and translating into the Uzbek language, he became good at singing Indian songs. Ermatov family visited RK Studio, founded by Raj Kapoor in Mumbai in India, to pay tribute to their inspiration Raj Kapoor.

They first went viral after Khakhramon sung cult classic song Awaara Hoon, from Raj Kapoor's 1951 film Awaara, during the celebration of 25 years of India–Uzbekistan relations at the Indian embassy in Uzbekistan. Raj Kapoor and his songs are very popular in India and overseas, especially in the former USSR bloc.

== Career ==
The group was founded in 2010 and performed its first concert in the same year. Their first Bollywood concert was in 2017. They have sung in several Indian languages such as Hindi, Marathi, Tamil, Telugu, Punjabi, and Malayalam. They have performed in Indian cities such as Delhi, Agra, Mumbai, Pune, and Coimbatore. Their Delhi concert was attended by Raj Kapoor's son Rishi Kapoor who was moved to tears. They received a good response from the Indian audience during their performances in several cities of India in 2018-19. They sing old and contemporary popular songs, including melodies of Raj Kapoor, Manoj Kumar, Sadhana, Shah Rukh Khan, Priyanka Chopra, Deepika Padukone, Kajol, and more.

During their January 2018 performance in Coimbatore, they were the stars of the event. The group started with the national anthem Jana Gana Mana of India and State Anthem of Uzbekistan and also sung popular songs by Raj Kapoor and the Malayalam song Entammede Jimikki Kammal. During the COVID-19 pandemic lockdown, they held a virtual tv concert on the Indian channel ABP News to cheer people up.

== Reception ==
Their concerts in several Indian cities and TV shows, with songs in many Indian languages, have been well received. Rishi Kapoor and Shashi Tharoor shared their music video on Twitter, Rishi Kapoor was touched by their performance of his father's songs, and Shashi Tharoor lauded them as an example of the soft power of India.

== Awards ==
The band has won several international contests. Lead singer Khakhramon was also honored with Uzbekistan's Nihol award by the President of Uzbekistan for excellence in music.

== See also ==
- Music of Bollywood
- Natalie Di Luccio
- Tata Young
