= Shashmaqam =

Central Asian musical genre

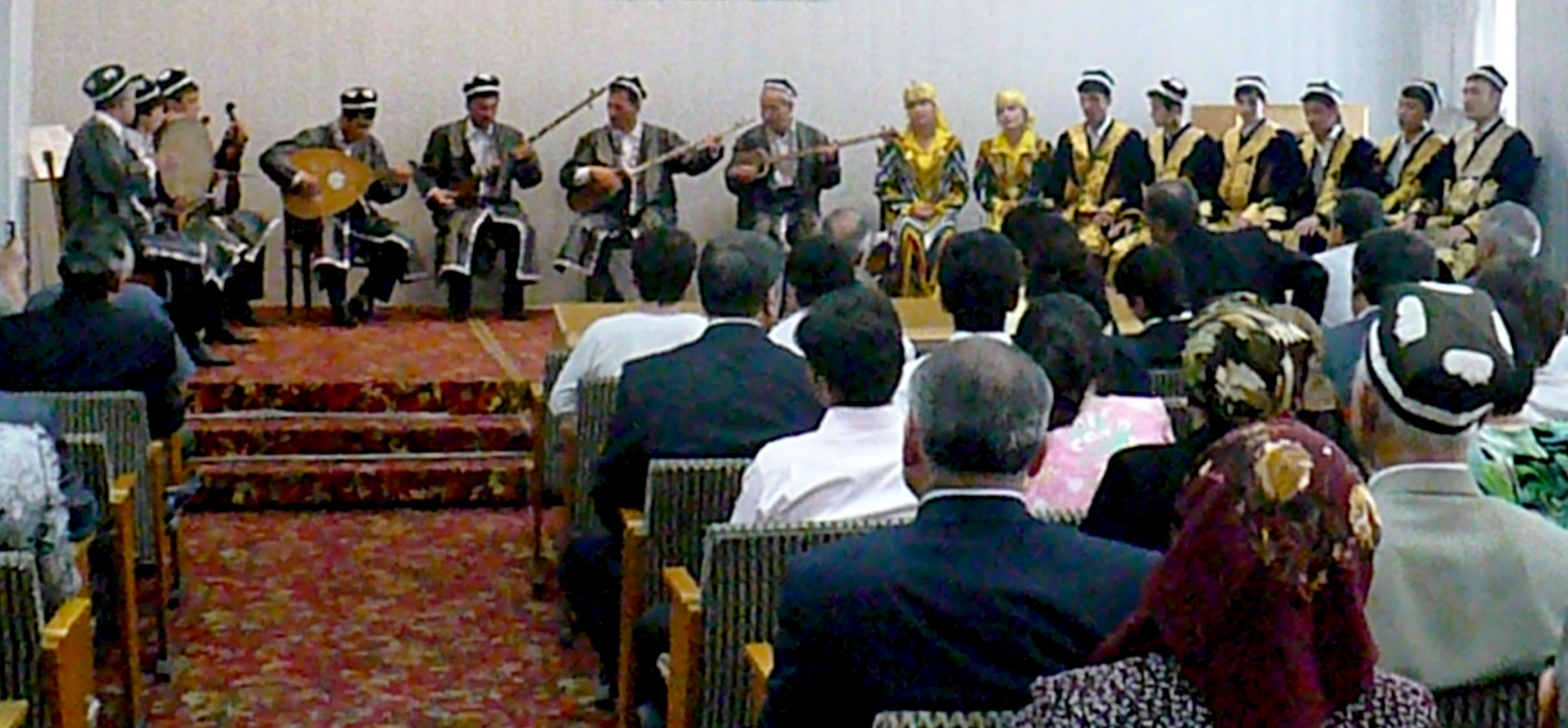
- Shashmaqam in Tajikistan
- Native name: Шашмақом / Shashmaqom
- Cultural origins: Tajik and Uzbek music
- Typical instruments: Long-necked lutes, dayra, and sato

Shashmaqom music
- UNESCO Intangible Cultural Heritage
- Country: Tajikistan and Uzbekistan
- Reference: 00089
- Region: Asia and the Pacific

Inscription history
- Inscription: 2008 (3rd session)
- List: Representative

Shashmaqom (/ˌʃæʃməˈkɒm/ SHASH-mə-KOM; Uzbek: [ˌʃæʃmaˈqɒm]; Tajik: [ʃɐʃmɐˈqɔm]) is a Central Asian musical genre (typical of Tajikistan and Uzbekistan) which may have developed in the city of Bukhara. Shashmaqam means the six Maqams (modes) in the Persian language, dastgah being the name for Persian modes, and maqams being the name for modes more generally.

It is a refined sort of music, with lyrics derived from Sufi poems about divine love. The instruments of shashmaqоm provide an austere accompaniment to the voices. They consist, at most concerts, of a pair of long-necked lutes (rawap, tar, tanbur or dutar), the dayra, or frame drum, which, with its jingles, is very much like a tambourine, and the sato, or bowed tanbur.

== History ==
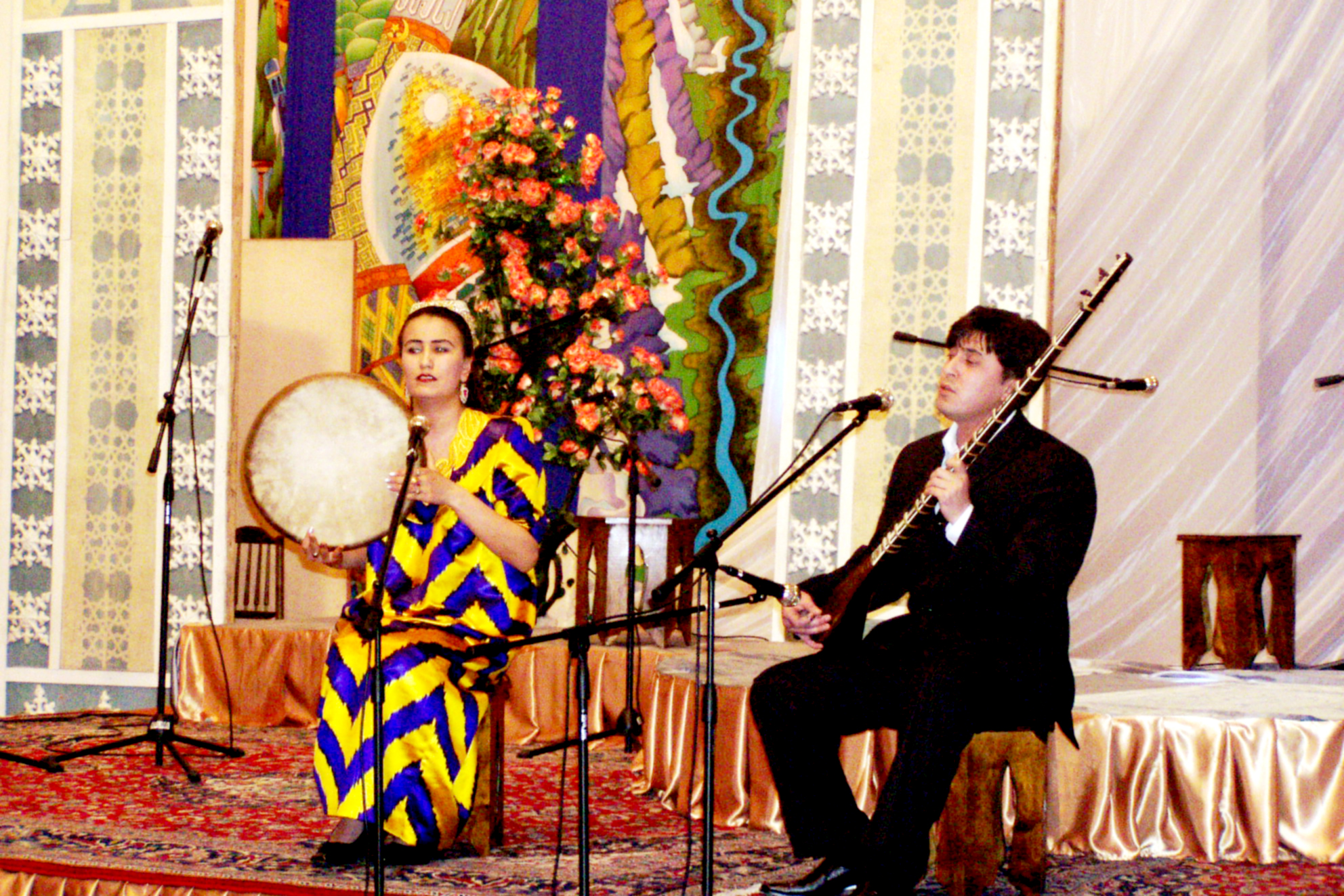
Shashmaqam in Tajikistan

In the first half of the 20th century in Uzbekistan, Abdul Rauf Fitrad, member of the Jadid, was particularly interested in shashmaqam, the traditional music of the Court. In 1927, he wrote a book called Ozbek klasik Muzikasi va uning Tarikhi (Uzbek classical music and its history), in which he presented shashmaqam as a grand musical tradition of the Uzbek people. In the 1930s, during the Soviet regime of Joseph Stalin, Uzbek shashmaqom was seen as an echo of the feudal ruling class and as a kind of music that impinged cultural progress toward adoption of European-style harmony. Finally, in 1951, a decree from the president of the Uzbekistan Union of Composers, reaffirmed by the committee of Uzbekistan, suppressed the maqom and the development of the musical practice.

During the mid-50s, the maqam began an ideological rehabilitation. In Tajikistan, the local leadership decided that shashmaqom should form a part of the national traditional heritage. Tension between Tajikistan and Uzbekistan led to the differentiation between the Tajik shashmaqom as developed in Dushanbe, and the Uzbek shashmaqam as developed in Tashkent. Tajik books made no mention of Uzbek shashmaqam and vice versa.

During the 1980s, this artificial division began to change. Uzbekistan began to learn about the Tajik shashmaqam, and Tajikistan learnt of the Uzbek shashmaqom. This has survived to the present, but a surge of nationalism in Uzbekistan may change that: singers on the radio in Bukhara, a city perfectly bilingual in Uzbek and Tajik, are using only the Uzbek texts in their shashmaqom music broadcasts.

This style of music was brought to the Western world, particularly to the United States, by the Bukharian Jews of Central Asia. Many of them were successful performers of Shasmaqom and brought it to the West.

== See also ==
- Klezmer
- Music of Tajikistan
- Music of Uzbekistan
- Lazgi
