= Sato (instrument) =

Uzbek musical instrument

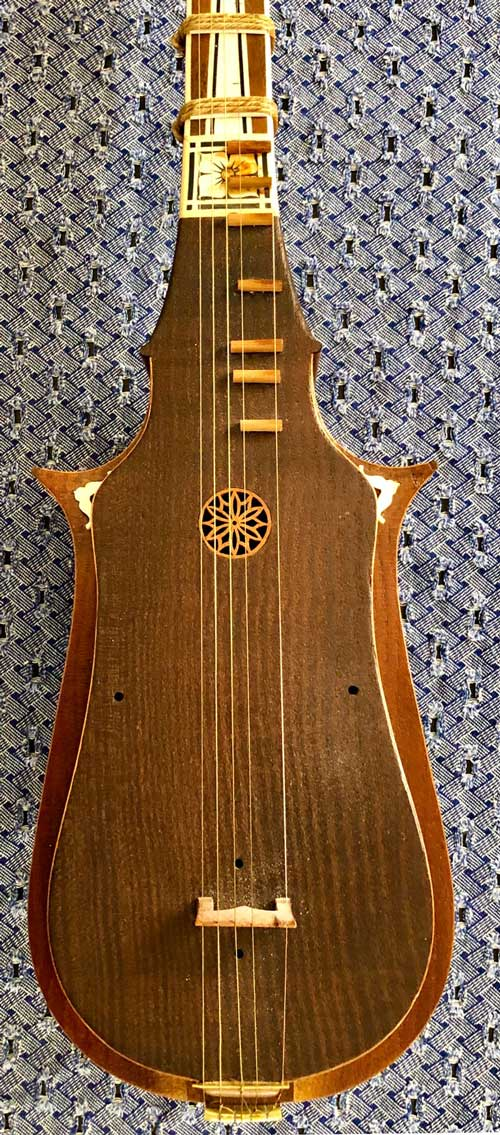
the sato, a Central Asian instrument with 5 strings.

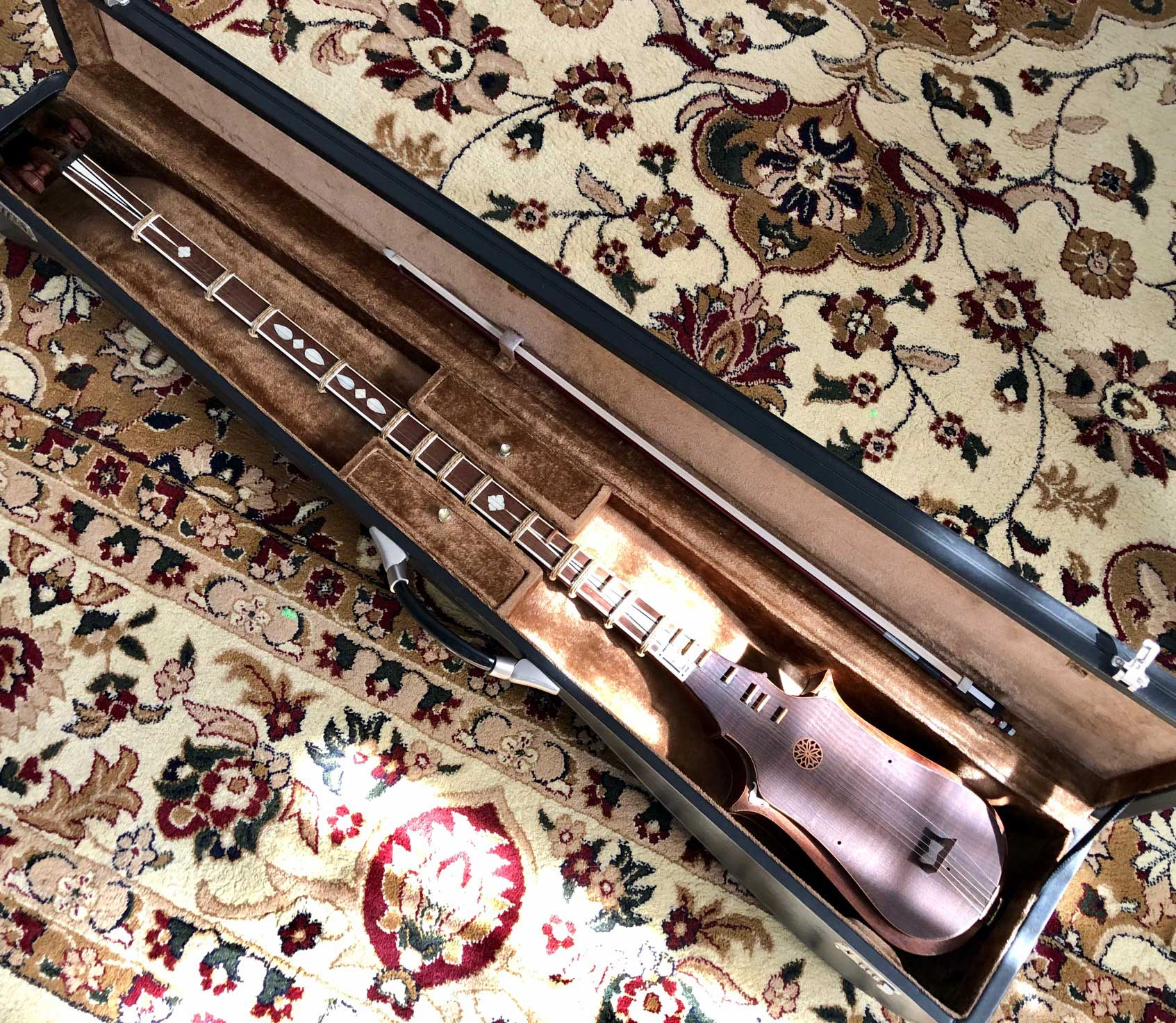
Sato and bow in a hard case

The Sato (Uzbek: Сато) is a bowed tanbur, or long-necked lute, played by performers of Central Asian classical and folk music, mainly in Uzbekistan. It has five strings. When plucked, the top string is pressed to the neck to produce a melody; the other four strings are drone strings. Frets on the neck are made of tied string. The soundboard has holes drilled in it for sound holes. It is made from mulberry wood.

Famous Uzbek musician Turgun Alimatov is solely responsible for reviving the art of playing the Sato, as it had completely disappeared for a number of centuries before he took it up in 1957. Thus he has been considered as the founder of the Sato and its playing style and technique. Professor Abduvali Abdurashidov is the foremost teacher of Sato and composer of the art of Shash Maqom (also called Shashmaqam) in Tajikistan.

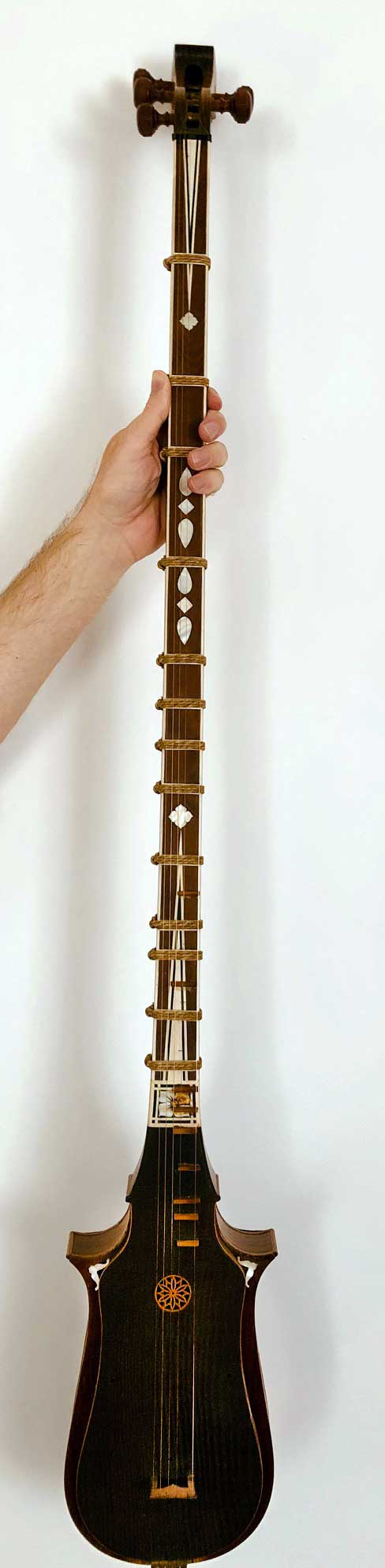
the sato, a Central Asian instrument with 5 strings.

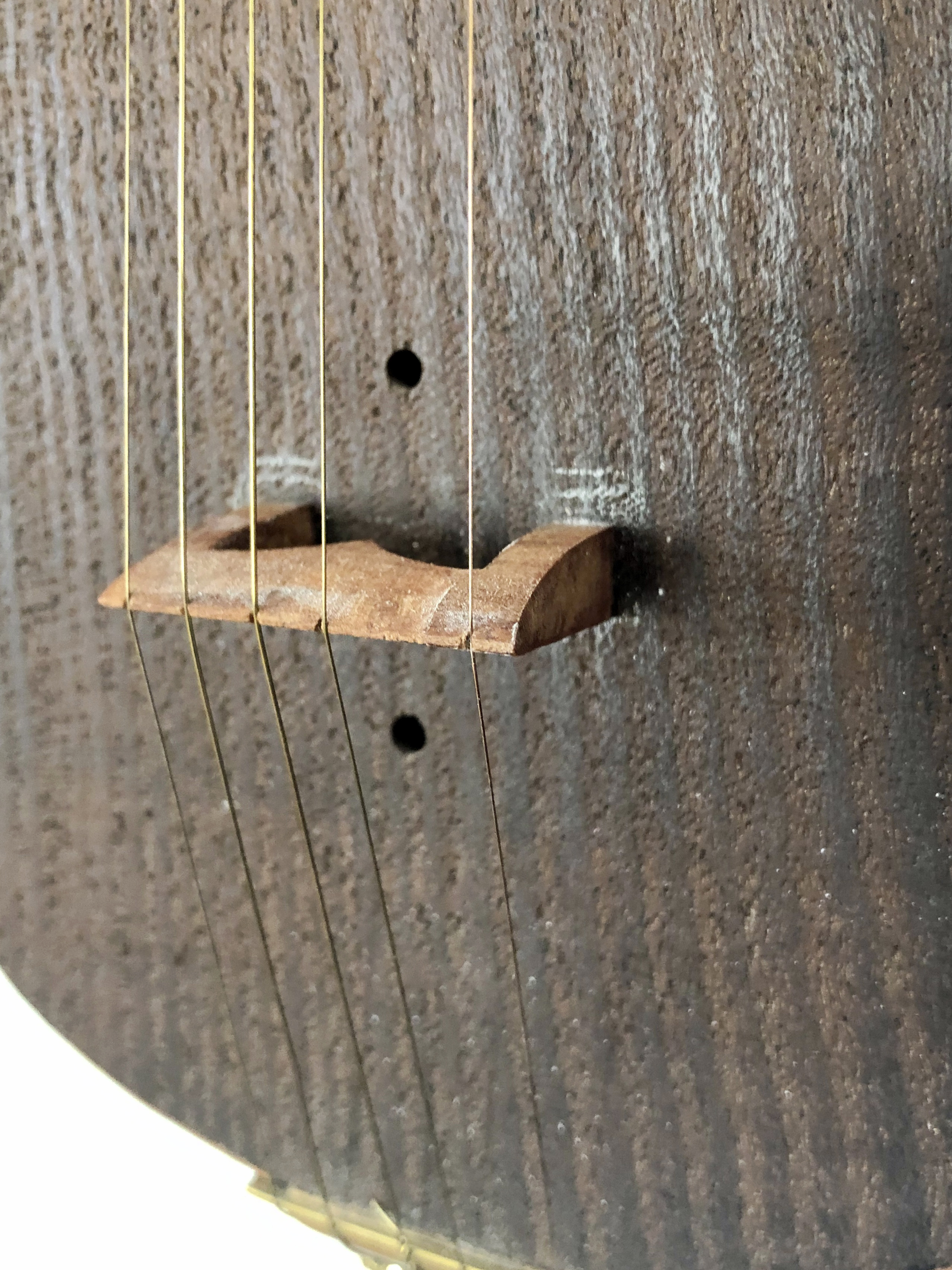
The bridge of the instrument the sato is called xarak - also the word used for bench and donkey

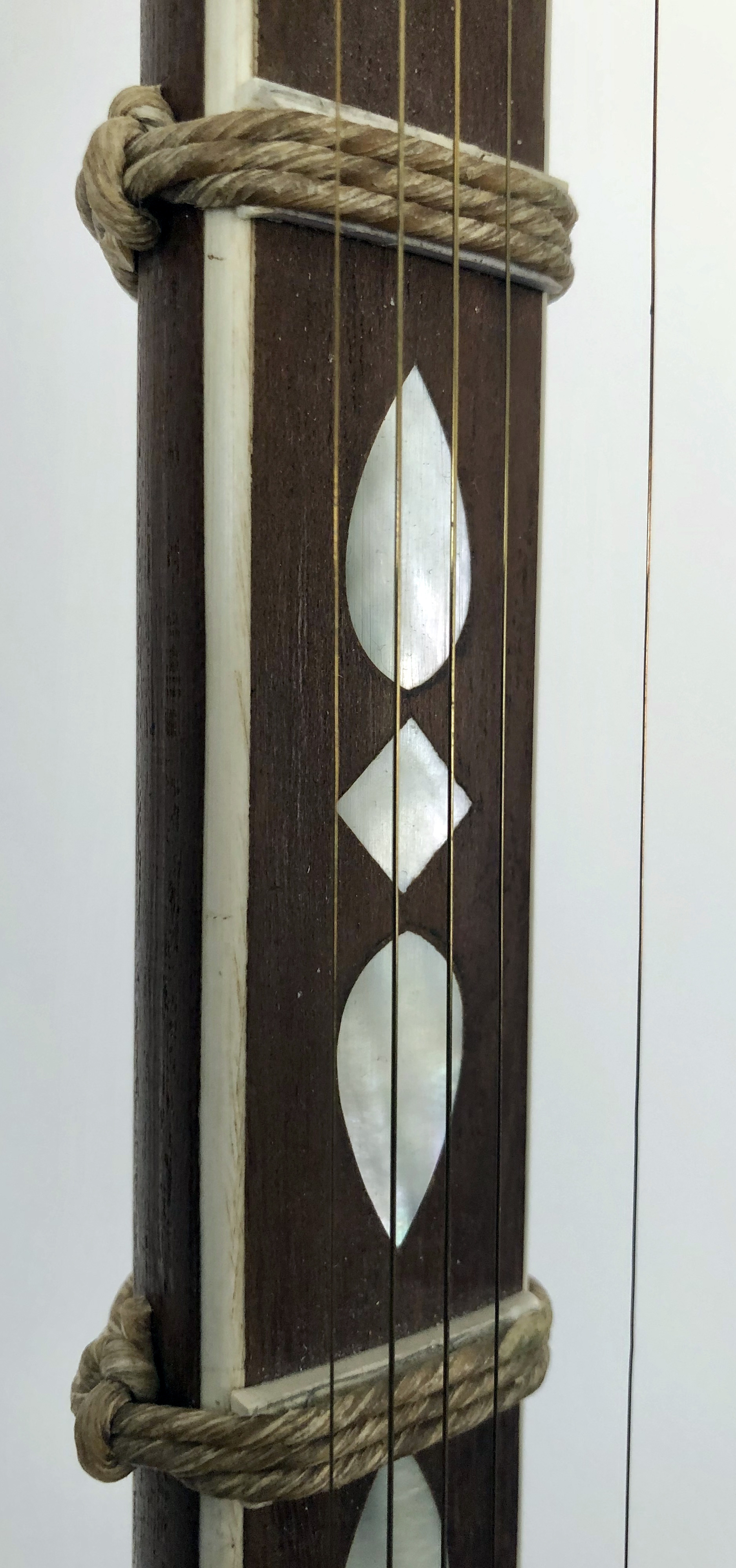
the inlays are usually mother-of-pearl, and the frets are generally made of string or gut.

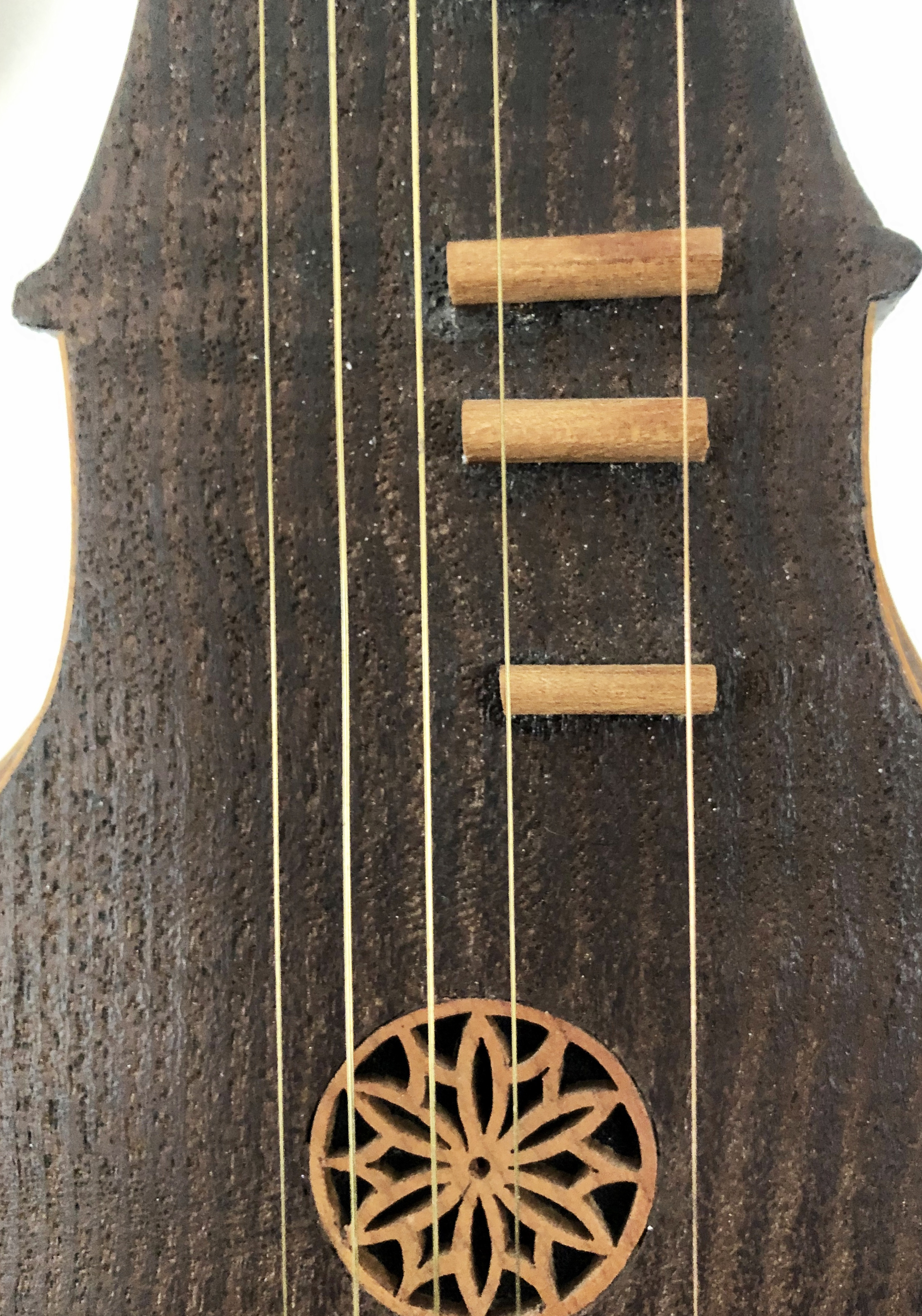
the highest frets on the sato are made of wood.

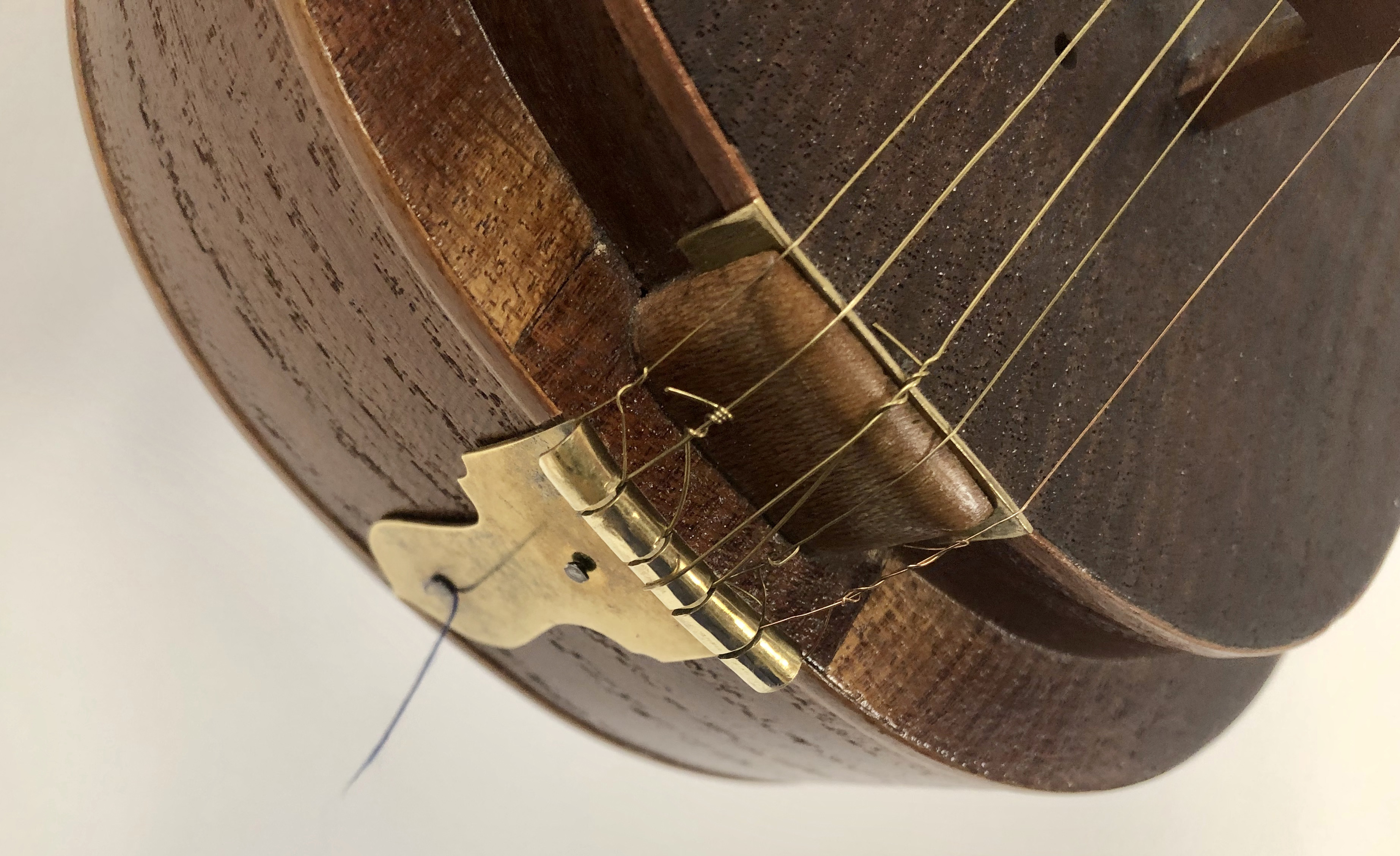
The strings are tied off in a loop and anchored on the metal plate at the bottom. the top string is set slightly apart from the 4 drone strings, and is elevated higher above the finger board as well.

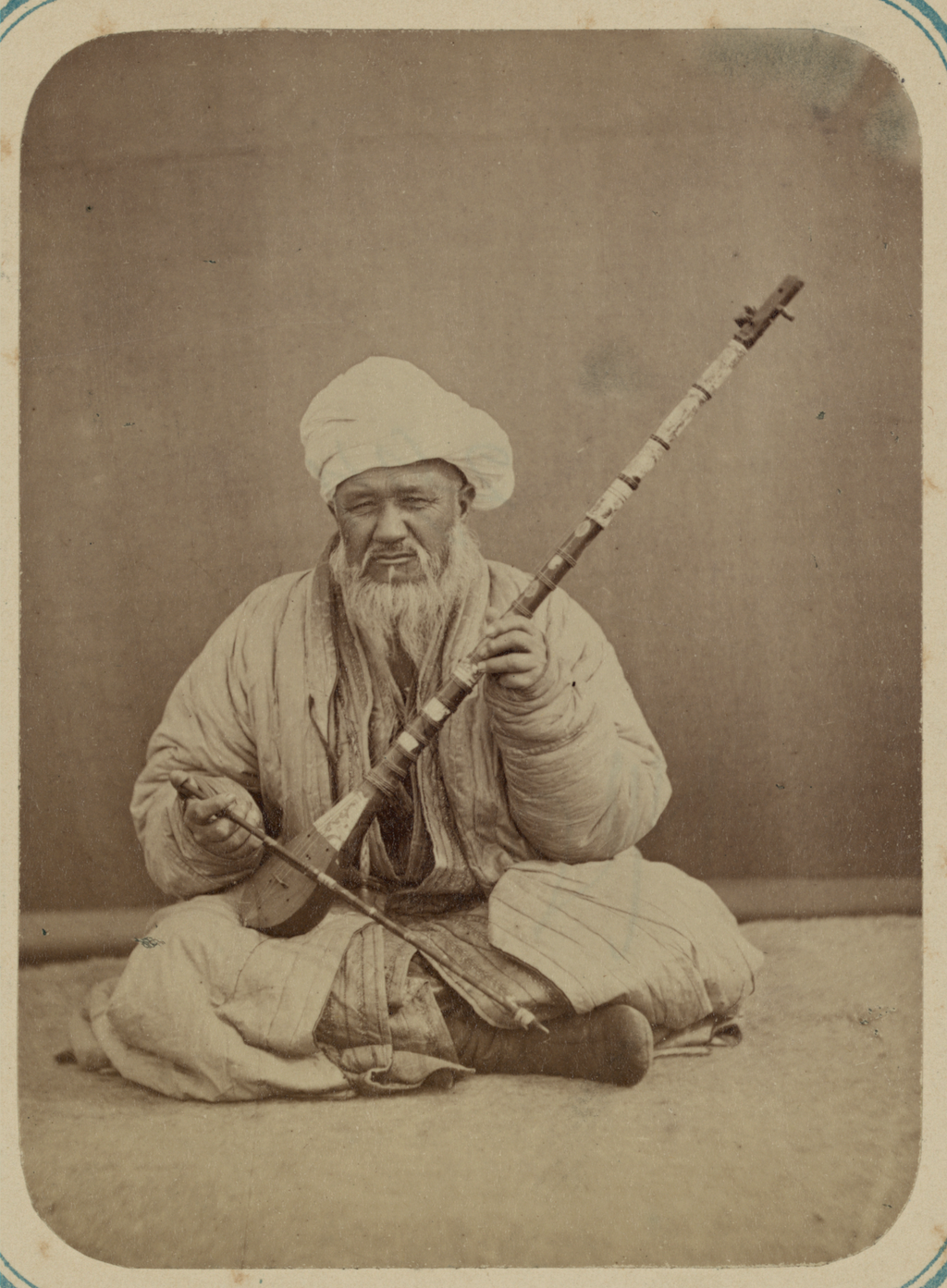
1869, Russian Turkestan. Long necked bowed "kamanche," but possibly related to Sato, based on instrument type and location
