= Dutar =

Long-necked two-stringed lute from Iran and Central Asia

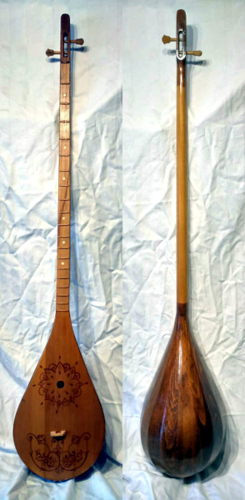
- Front and back of a dutar

String instrument
- Classification: Plucked

Related instruments
- Bouzouki; Çiftelia; Dotara; Pandura; Tambouras; Tanbur

Traditional skills of crafting and playing Dotār
- UNESCO Intangible Cultural Heritage
- Country: Iran
- Reference: 01492
- Region: Asia and the Pacific

Inscription history
- Inscription: 2019 (14th session)
- List: Representative

Dutar making craftsmanship and traditional music performing art combined with singing
- UNESCO Intangible Cultural Heritage
- Country: Turkmenistan
- Reference: 01565
- Region: Asia and the Pacific

Inscription history
- Inscription: 2021 (16th session)
- List: Representative

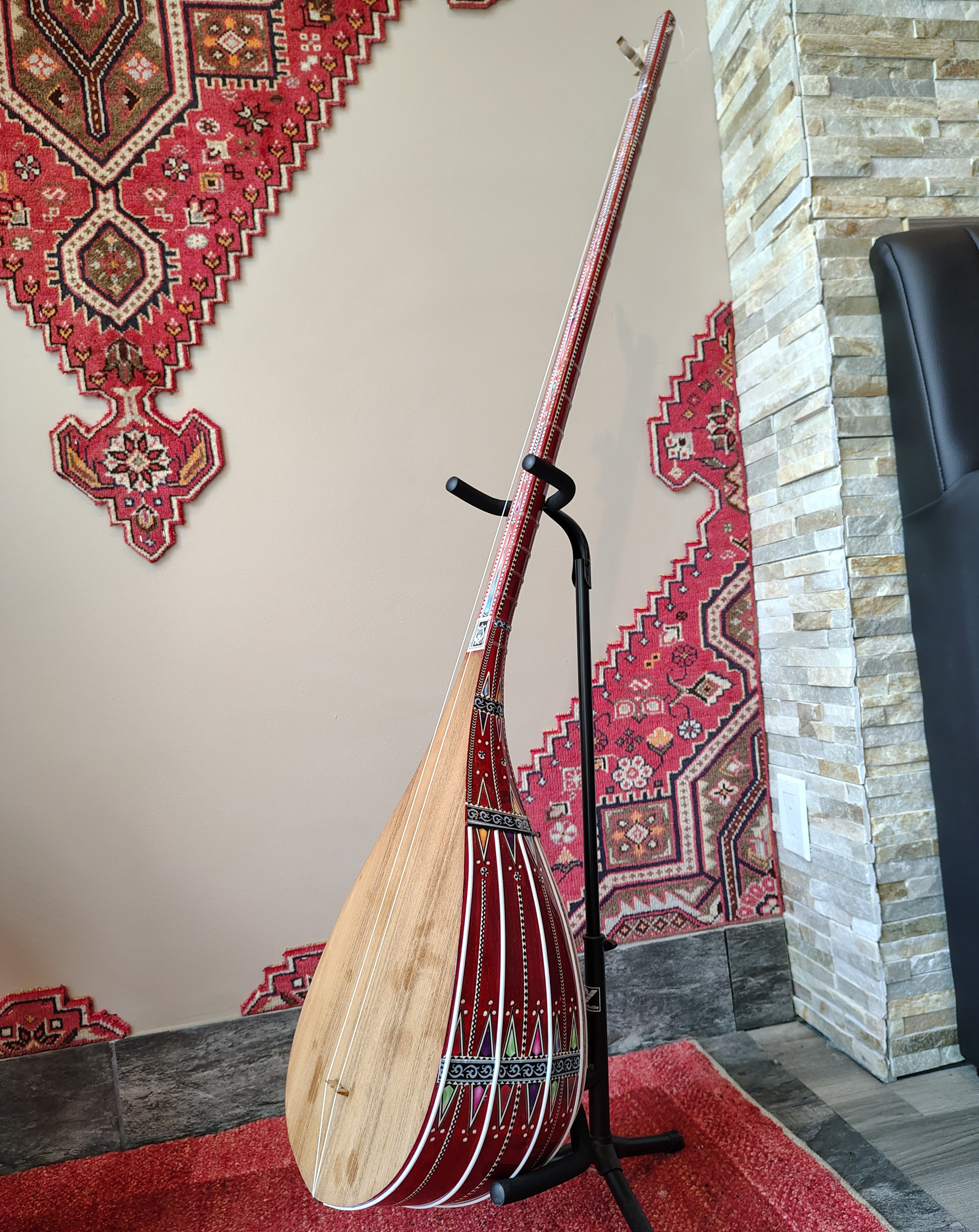
A Uyghur dutar

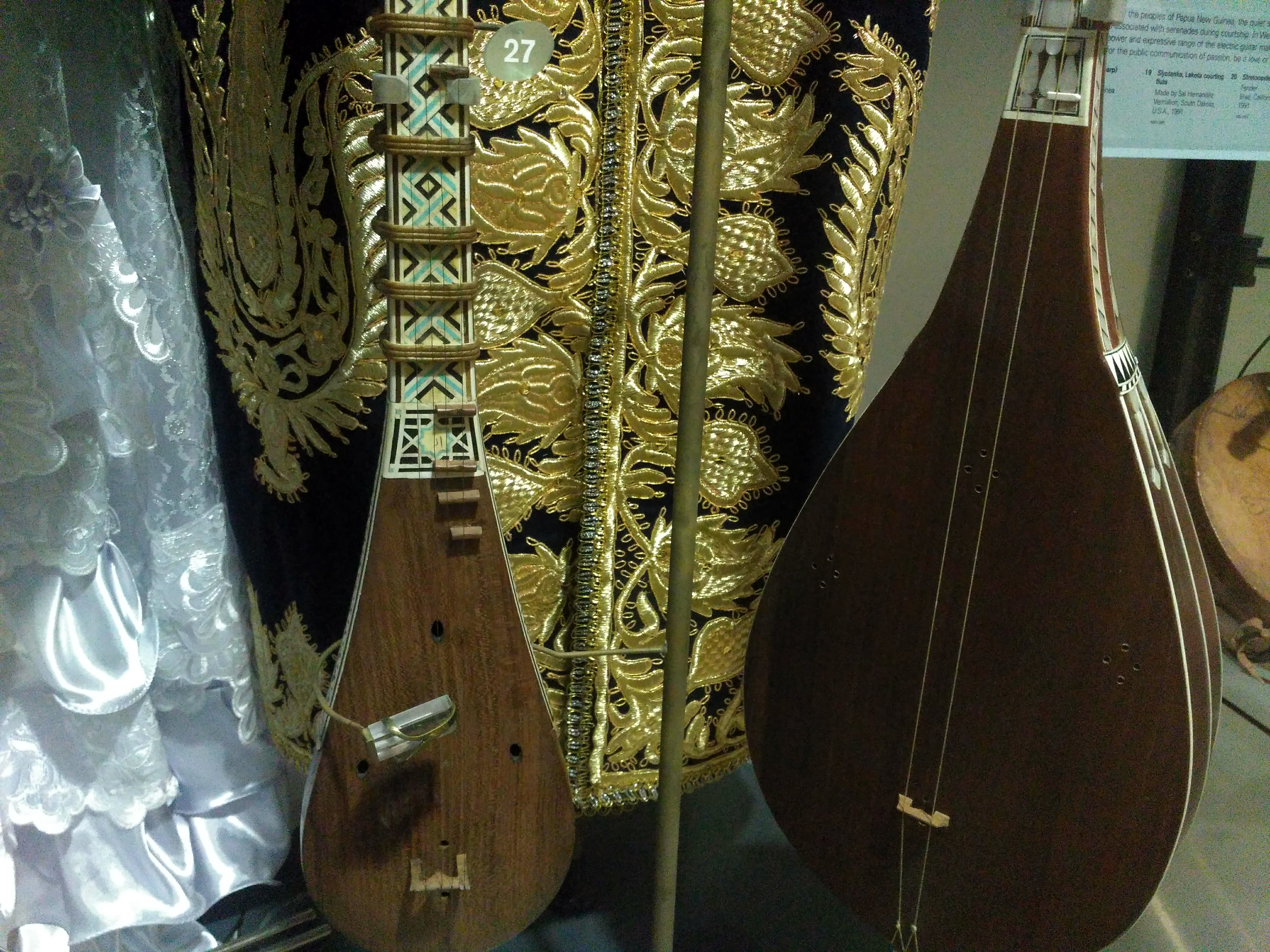
A dutar (right) alongside a tanbur (left) in the Horniman Museum, London, United Kingdom

The dutar (also dotar; Persian: دوتار, romanized: dutâr; Russian: Дутар; Tajik: Дутор; Uzbek: Дутор; Uyghur: دۇتار, Дутар, romanized: Dutar; Dungan: Дутар) is a traditional Iranian long-necked two-stringed lute found in Iran and Central Asia.

Its name comes from the Persian word for "two strings", دوتار do tār (< دو do "two",تار tār "string"), although the Herati dutar of Afghanistan has fourteen strings.

Dutar is very popular in Tajikistan and Khorasan province of Iran. When played, the strings are usually plucked by the Uyghurs of Western China and strummed and plucked by the Tajiks, Turkmen, Uzbeks. Related instruments include the Kazakh dombra. The dutar is also an important instrument among the tork of Khorasan amongst whom Haj Ghorban Soleimani of Quchan was a noted virtuoso. In tork one who plays the dutar is known as a bakci (bakhshi) similar to Turkmen bagşy, while in Azeri the term is ashiq. Khorasan bakhshi music is recognized on the Representative List of the Intangible Cultural Heritage of Humanity.

At the time of the dutar's humble origins in the 15th century as a shepherd's instrument its strings were made from gut. However, with the opening up of the Silk Road, catgut gave way to strings made from twisted silk imported from China. To this day some instruments still feature silk strings, although nylon or steel strings are also commonly used.

The dutar has a warm, dulcet tone. Typical sizes for the pear-shaped instrument range from one to two meters.

Typically it is tuned La Re or A D, but it also depends on the region.

== Turkmen dutar specifications ==
Musicologist Viktor Belyayev described the dutar in the 1920s thus:

The body of the dutar is made of a solid piece of mulberry wood, burnt and hollowed out. This body is pear-shaped. The fingerboard of the dutar is narrow and rounded, convenient for two fingers to grip and for quick movements of the hands. The dutar has two strings made of local Turkmen raw silk. The usual dimensions of the dutar: the length of the whole instrument is 87 cm, the length of the fingerboard is 37 cm, the length of the body (on its upper plane) is 48.5 cm. The strings of the dutar are tuned in quarta, and their construction is rather low-sometimes both strings are tuned in the small octave, sometimes the lower one goes even within the big octave. The dutar has thirteen frets, which are low metal lintels...

The dutar is a “plucked” instrument, although this expression does not quite fit here, because the strings on the dutar are not plucked with the fingers, as on the guitar, and are not brought into vibration with a plectrum, as on the mandolin, but are struck with quick strokes of the hand, just as it is done on the Russian balalaika, derived from the eastern dutar, and brought to Russia during the Tatar invasion. The technique of the right hand when playing the dutar requires great development, because, due to the softness of its sound, this instrument requires rapid repetition of beats. Turkmen music for dutar is entirely two-voiced, and fourths are taken with the thumb and middle finger, fifths are taken with the thumb and little finger, and major and minor tertias are taken with the thumb and index finger. The ring finger participates mainly only in melismas and is of secondary importance for basic fingering when playing the dutar.

Ideally the dutar's neck is made of apricot wood, and in the modern era the strings are more likely to be steel than either silk or gut. Traditionally the dutar has thirteen frets corresponding to an octave plus an augmented second, and is tuned to fourths.

In modern times it has transitioned from being a solo instrument used purely to accompany a singer to an ensemble instrument as well as for performing purely instrumental numbers.

The Smithsonian Institution describes the Turkmen dutar as a "two string fretted lute turned to the interval of a fourth" made of apricot, mulberry, and walnut wood with steel frets, strings, and tuners.

== Notable players ==
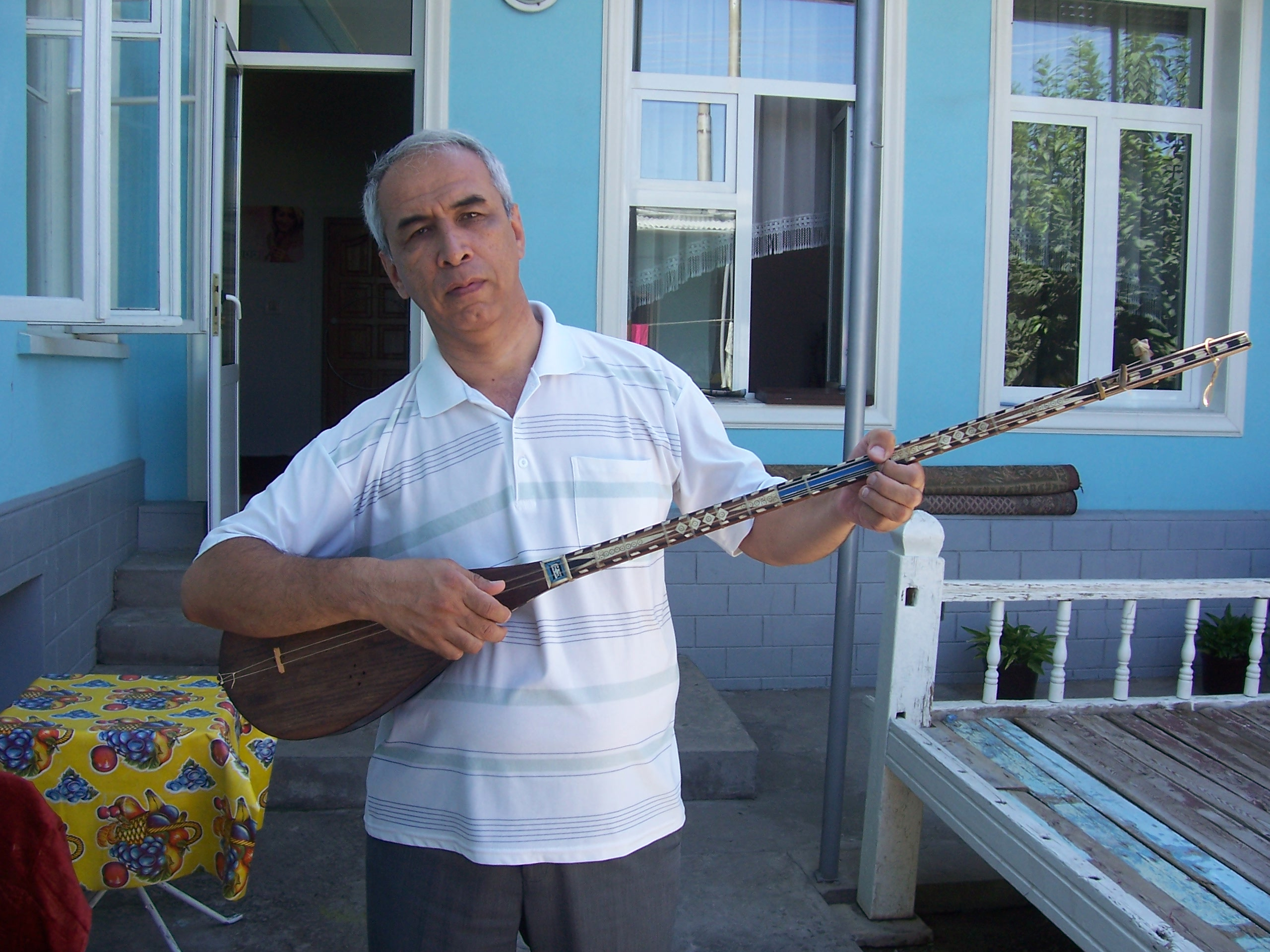
An Uzbek dutar player

- Turgun Alimatov (1922–2008)
- Abdurahim Hamidov (1952–2013)
- Abdurehim Heyit (Uyghur) (1962–)
- Alireza Soleimani (Aliabad, Khorasan)
- Haj Ghorban Soleimani (1920–2008)
- Sanubar Tursun (1971–)

== See also ==
- Shashmaqam
- Turgun Alimatov
- Dotara
- Bağlama
- Çiftelia
- Music of Iran
- Music of Afghanistan
- Music of Tajikistan
- Music of Turkmenistan
- Music of Central Asia
