= Rayhon =

Uzbek singer (born 1978)

Rayhon Райхон
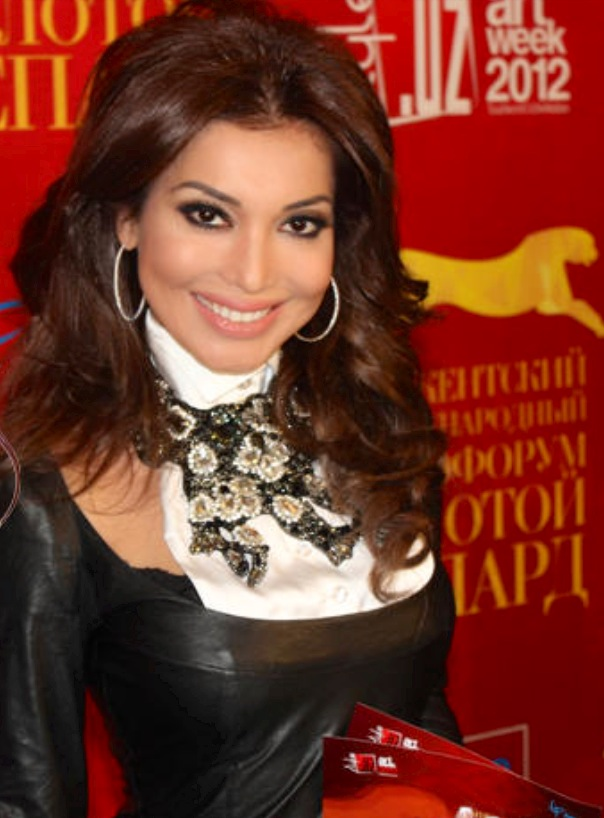
- Rayhon in 2012
- Born: Rayxona Gʻaniyeva; 16 September 1978 (age 47); Tashkent, Uzbek SSR, USSR
- Education: Uzbekistan State Institute of World Languages
- Occupations: singer, songwriter, and film actress
- Years active: 1999–present
- Style: Pop; Dance pop; Pop folk
- Parent(s): Otabek Khatamovich Ganiev, Tamara Shakirova

Rayhon Gʻaniyeva (Uzbek: Rayhon Gʻaniyeva / Райҳон Ғаниева; Russian: Райхон Ганиева; born 16 September 1978, in Tashkent), better known simply as Rayhon, is an Uzbek singer, songwriter, and film actress. She is an honored artist of Uzbekistan. She rose to prominence in Uzbekistan with her song "Baxtli boʻlaman" ("I'll Be Happy") in 2002. Rayhon has recorded songs both in Uzbek and Russian.

Rayhon came to prominence within the Uzbek film industry with her leading role in the 2007 Uzbek drama film 'Kechir' (Forgive Me) which she co-wrote and directed. She received positive reviews for her performance in the film both from movie critics and fans. However, she has not made any major film appearance since.

== Life ==
Rayhon Gʻaniyeva was born to a well-known family. Her mother, Tamara Shokirova, was a highly acclaimed Uzbek actress who received the title Meritorious Artist of the Uzbek SSR. Her father, Otabek Gʻaniyev, was also a well-known actor in Uzbekistan and other former Soviet countries. Her great-grandfather Nabi Gʻaniyev was a prominent film director whose films played a significant role in the moulding and development of the Cinema of Uzbekistan.

On 16 November 2012, Rayhon married Yigitali Mamajonov, a 22-year-old student of the Tashkent Theatrical Institute. Mamajonov subsequently appeared in several of Rayhon's music videos. On 5 May 2014, Rayhon gave birth to twin boys. On 9 January 2015, Uzbek media reported that Rayhon and Mamajonov had ended their relationship. Rayhon married Farhod Alimov, a television presenter, on 26 October 2016.

== Career ==
Rayhon learned to play the piano at a children's music school in Tashkent. She graduated from the Uzbek State Institute of World Languages in Tashkent with a degree in English philology.

When Rayhon was a third-year student, she organized a duo that was called Xayol (Thought). In 2000, she started her career as a solo singer. Rayhon gained widespread recognition in Uzbekistan with her song "Baxtli boʻlaman" from her eponymous album which was released in 2002. Later that year she gave her first concert to a large audience at the Alisher Navoiy Opera and Ballet Theater in Tashkent.

Rayhon came to prominence within the Uzbek film industry with her leading role in the 2007 Uzbek drama film Kechir (Forgive Me) which she co-wrote and directed. In the film, she portrayed the difficult life of a successful singer. Rayhon also wrote and sang the eponymous title song that was included in the soundtrack of the film. She received positive reviews for her performance in the film both from movie critics and fans. However, she has not made any major film appearance since.

== Discography ==
=== Studio albums ===
"Baxtli boʻlaman"
Sample of "Baxtli boʻlaman." Rayhon gained widespread recognition in Uzbekistan after the release of this song in 2002.

Rayhon has released 15 studio albums to date.

- Sensiz (2001)
- Baxtli boʻlaman (2002)
- Sevgilim (2004)
- Faqat muhabbat (2005)
- Yodingdami? (2006)
- Sogʻindim (2007)
- Doimo (2008)
- Orzuinga ishon (2009)
- Tabassum qil (2010)
- Sevaveraman (2011)
- Sevgi bu nima? (2012)
- Oyijon (2013)
- Izlama (2015)
- Tomchi (2018)
- Mayli manda (2020)

=== Music videos ===
| Year | Title | Director |
|---|---|---|
| 2000 | "Azoblaysan" | |
| 2002 | "Baxtli boʻlaman" | |
| 2002 | "Bila turib" | |
| 2004 | "Faqat muhabbat" | |
| 2005 | "Hech ayrilma" | Jasur Shametov |
| 2005 | "Men nechun yaraldim?" | |
| 2005 | "Qaytolmayman" | Jasur Shametov |
| 2006 | "Aytolmayman" | |
| 2006 | "Intilib yashayman" | Yodgor Nosirov |
| 2006 | "Xoʻp mayli" | Jasur Shametov |
| 2006 | "Yodingdami?" | Jasur Shametov |
| 2006 | "Yolgʻizim" | |
| 2007 | "Baka-bang" | |
| 2007 | "Izlaysan" | |
| 2007 | "Oʻrtamizda" | |
| 2007 | "Sen ketding" | |
| 2007 | "Seni deb" | |
| 2007 | "Sogʻindim" | |
| 2008 | "Afsus" | |
| 2008 | "Doimo" | |
| 2008 | "Netay" | |
| 2008 | "Yor-yor" | Yodgor Nosirov |
| 2009 | "Nega?" | |
| 2009 | "Oruzinga ishon" | Yodgor Nosirov |
| 2009 | "Yalola" (featuring Bojalar) | |
| 2009 | "Yonimda boʻlsang" | |
| 2010 | "Bombey" | Yodgor Nosirov |
| 2010 | "Javob bergin" | |
| 2010 | "Men bu — men" (featuring Manzura) | |
| 2010 | "Sen bilan" | |
| 2010 | "Sevaveraman" | |
| 2010 | "Tabassun qil" | |
| 2010 | "U meniki" | |
| 2011 | "Baxtli kunlar" | |
| 2011 | "Bilmagandim" | |
| 2011 | "Ishonmay" | |
| 2011 | "Seni deya" | |
| 2011 | "Sumbula" | |
| 2011 | "Yurak uradi" | |
| 2012 | "Nega endi?" | |
| 2012 | "Unutaman" | Rustam Murodov |
| 2012 | "Прости" | |
| 2013 | "Aldangan yurak" | |
| 2013 | "Oyijon" | |
| 2013 | "Qani?" | Nozim Jumayev |
| 2013 | "Qayerdasan?" | |
| 2013 | "Samodan" | |
| 2013 | "Soʻnggi nafas" | |
| 2013 | "Yuragimdasan" | Jasur Shametov |
| 2013 | "Yuragimdasan" (remix) | Jasur Shametov |
| 2013 | "Мама" | |
| 2014 | "Asalim mani" | |
| 2014 | "Izlama" | Jasur Shametov |
| 2014 | "Ne boʻlar?" | Davlat Arabshoyev; Xusan Solihov |
| 2014 | "Soʻnaman" | |
| 2015 | "Dilimo" | Yodgor Nosirov |
| 2015 | "Kelinchak" | |
| 2015 | "Parvoz etay" | Jasur Shametov |
| 2015 | "Koʻnikmadim" (featuring Lola Yoʻldosheva) | Jasur Shametov |
| 2016 | "Javob ber" | |
| 2016 | "Yolgʻizlikda" | |
| 2016 | "Tabib" | Yodgor Nosirov |
| 2016 | "Habibi" | |
| 2016 | "Xalos et" | Yodgor Nosirov |
| 2016 | "Namaste" | Nozim Jumayev |
| 2017 | "Olib ket" | |
| 2017 | "Bor yoki yoʻq" (featuring Munisa Rizayeva) | |
| 2017 | "Aldamagin" (featuring Bojalar) | |
| 2017 | "Vatan" | |
| 2017 | "Unutolaman" | |
| 2017 | "Hamma jam" | |
| 2018 | "Tomchi" | |
| 2018 | "Yurak" ("Tomchi Part II") | |
| 2018 | "Ajabo" | |
| 2018 | "Mayli manda" | |
| 2019 | "Armondan soʻra" | |
| 2019 | "Ayt, nega?" | |
| 2019 | "Yolgʻonmi?" | |
| 2019 | "Alda" | |
| 2019 | "Yig'lama qizaloq" | |

== Filmography ==
=== Actress ===
Film
| Year | Film | Role | Notes |
|---|---|---|---|
| 1980 | Ленинградцы, дети мои... (The Residents of Leningrad, My Children...) | Rayhon. Khadicha's daughter | |
| 2000 | Tohir va Zuhra yangi talqin (Tohir and Zuhra (New Interpretation)) | Zuhra | Musical |
| 2006 | Yangi yil parisi (A New Year's Beauty) | Herself | Musical |
| 2006 | Voy dod sumalak (Damn, Samanu!) | Herself | Musical |
| 2007 | Kechir (Forgive Me) | Samira | |
| 2010 | Ada emas, dada! Tohir va Zuhra 2 yangi talqin (Tohir and Zuhra 2 (New Interpretation)) | Zuhra/Herself | Musical |
| 2011 | Gʻaroyib orzular (Interesting Dreams) | Herself | Musical |
| 2016 | Sharofatxonning kelinlari yoxud Navroʻz muborak (Sharofatxon's Daughters-in-Law or Happy Nowruz) | Herself | Musical |
| 2017 | Sayl (Stroll) | Herself | Musical |

Television
| Year | Title | Role | Notes |
|---|---|---|---|
| 1999 | Zanjir (The Chain) | Nargiza | Episodes 3, 4, 5, 6, and 7 |
| 2018 | Joanna Lumley’s Silk Road Adventure | Self | Episode 4 |

Music video appearances
| Year | Song title | Artist |
|---|---|---|
| 2000 | "Nozlaringdan" | Ulugʻbek Otajonov |
| 2010 | "Yengilaman" | Manzura |

=== Director ===
| Year | Film | Notes |
|---|---|---|
| 2007 | Kechir (Forgive Me) | |

=== Screenwriter ===
| Year | Film | Notes |
|---|---|---|
| 2007 | Kechir (Forgive Me) | |

== Awards ==
Rayhon has received several awards throughout her career. She received her first Nihol, an annual award given to successful artists in Uzbekistan, in 2002. That same year Rayhon received a Tarona Award, an accolade given to recognize outstanding achievement in the music industry of Uzbekistan, for Best Female Singer. She won the same award in 2004.

Rayhon's album Baxtli boʻlaman gained positive reviews and won the singer a Tarona award for Best Album of the Year in 2003. In 2005, Rayhon received another Tarona for Best Album for her album Faqat muhabbat.
