= Kurdish tanbur =

Fretted string instrument

Kurdish tembûr
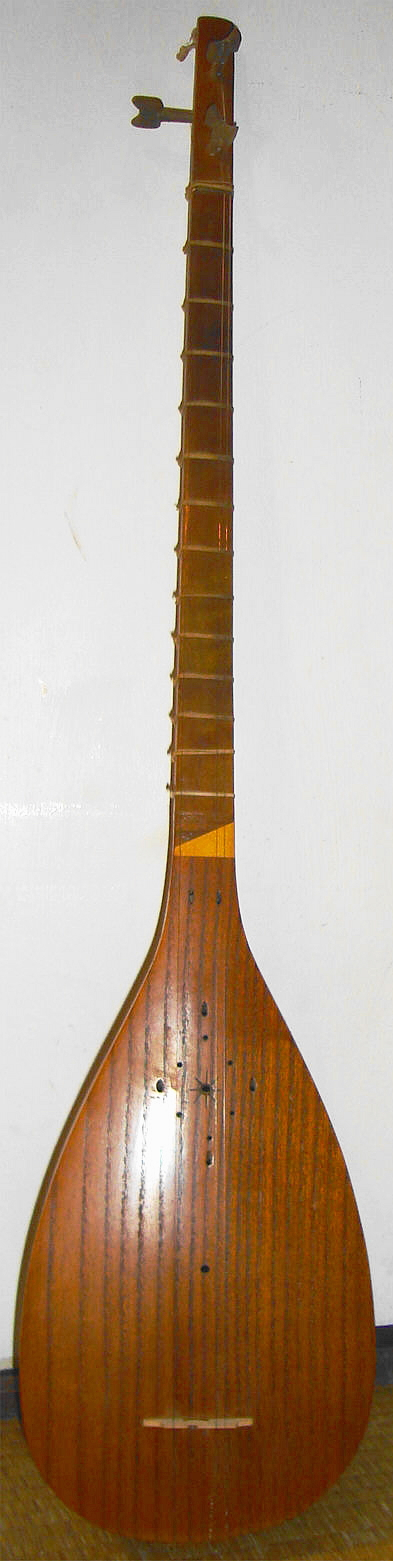

String instrument
- Other names: Tembûr, Tanbour, Tanbūr
- Classification: Plucked string instrument

Related instruments
- dutar; Tanbur; Setar; Turkish tambur; Tambura; Tambouras; Tamburica

Kurdish tanbur (Kurdish: ته‌مبوور, romanized: Tembûr) or tanbour a fretted string instrument, is an initial and main form of the tanbūr instrument family, used by the Kurds. It is highly associated with the Yarsan (Ehli Heq) religion in Kurdish areas and in the Lorestān provinces of Iran. It is one of the few musical instruments used in Ehli Heq rituals, and practitioners venerate the tembûr as a sacred object. Another popular percussion instrument used together with the tembur is the Kurdish daf, but that's not sacred in Yarsan spirituality and Jam praying ceremony.

Nowadays tembûr is played all over Iran, but Kurdish tembûr is mainly designed and has been for centuries in the Hawraman region in the provinces of Kermanshah Province, Kurdistan Province and Lorestan. The more traditional and accepted temburs originate from the cities of Kermanshah, Sahneh and Gahvareh. Tembûr is locally called temûr, temûre, temyere or the temyure (تَمیُرَه ، تَمیرَه ، تموره, تمور) there. The Kermanshah tembûr should not be confused with saz also called tembûr in Kurmancî Kurdish.

The tembûr measures 90 cm in length and 16 cm in width. The resonator is pear-shaped and made of either a single piece or multiple carvels of mulberry wood. The neck is made of walnut wood and has 13 or 14 frets or, arranged in a semi-tempered chromatic scale (one of the only middle eastern musical instruments not microtonal). The tembûr employs three metal strings that the first course is double. The melody is played on the double strings with a unique playing technique of strumming the right hand with each finger separately when motioning the hand upwards from the position beneath the strings.

== Notable players ==
- Ostad Elahi
- Ali Akbar Moradi
- Sohrab Pournazeri
- Seyed Khalil Alinezhad
- Şıvan Perwer
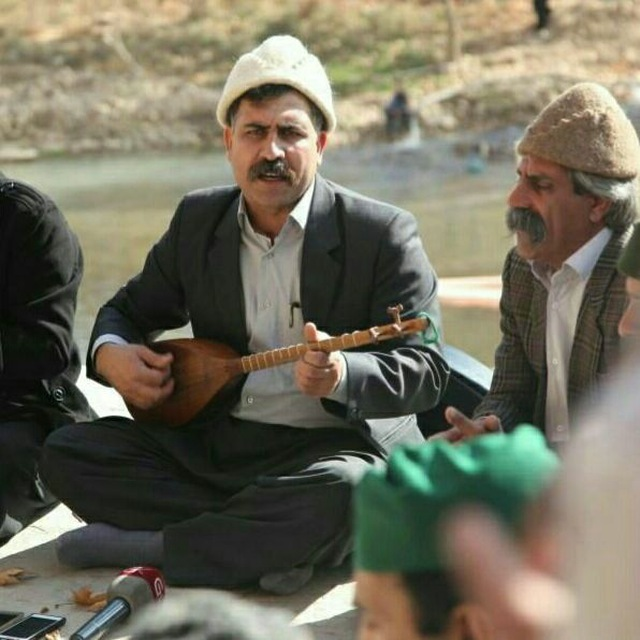
Musician and luthier Ghobad Ghobadi (تنبورقبادی), a face of Yarsanism plays a tanbur. Ghobadi makes tanburs in the Yarsan tradition.

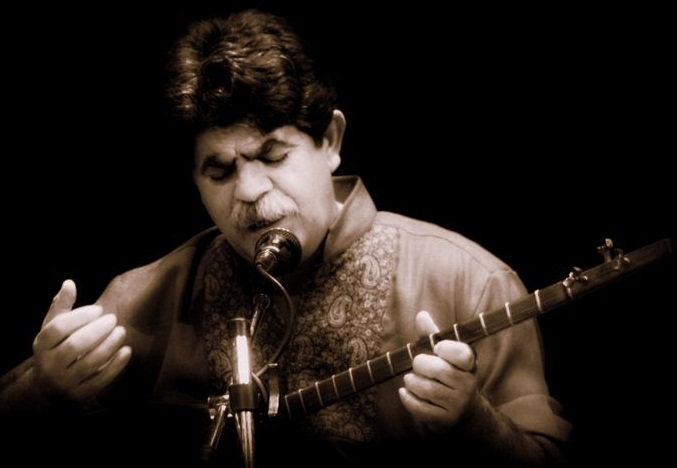
Ali Akbar Moradi

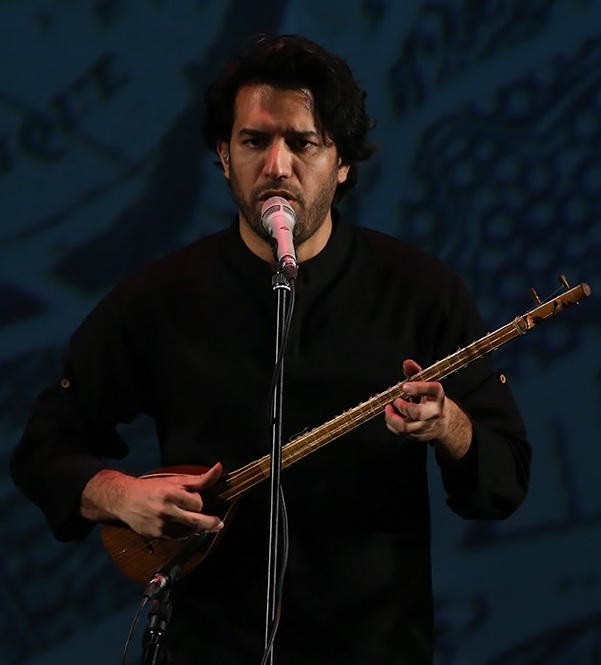
Sohrab Pournazeri

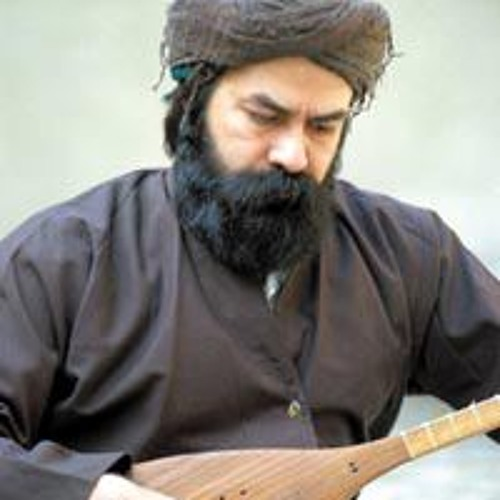
Seyed Khalil Alinezhad

== See also ==
- Kurdish music
- Lute
