= Reza Rasaei =

Iranian protestor

- رضا رسایی
- Born: 1990; Sahneh, Kermanshah province, Iran
- Died: 6 August 2024 (aged 33–34); Dizelabad Prison, Kermanshah, Iran
- Cause of death: Hanging
- Occupation: Human rights activist
- Criminal charges: Premeditated murder
- Criminal penalty: Death
- Criminal status: Executed

Reza Rasaei (Persian: رضا رسایی; c. 1990 – 6 August 2024) was a Kurdish human rights activist. Rasaei was arrested during the Mahsa Amini protests in 2022 and sentenced to death in a trial described as a "sham" by Amnesty International, and was the tenth protester to be executed.

== Biography ==
Rasaei was an Iranian Kurd and a follower of Yarsanism. He was from Sahneh in Kermanshah province.

On 18 November 2022, Rasaei attended a commemoration in Sahneh marking the death of the Yarsani spiritual leader Seyed Khalil Alinezhad. The memorial developed into a protest in memory of Kian Pirtalak, a child who had been killed two days earlier by security forces in Izeh during the crackdown on the Mahsa Amini protests. Rasaei had protested holding a photo of his cousin, who was detained by state officials at the time; he later stated he had received a telephone call from security forces prior to the memorial warning him not to participate in any protests.

On 24 November 2022, Rasaei was arrested during protests in Shahriar in connection to the death of Nader Birami, a commander of the Intelligence Organisation of the Islamic Revolutionary Guard Corps who had been stabbed multiple times during the protest in Sahneh on 18 November. Rasaei was transported to the Intelligence Organisation's headquarters in Sahneh where he was arbitrarily detained for four months before he was transferred to Dizelabad Prison in Kermanshah and able to speak to a lawyer for the first time since his arrest.

Rasaei reportedly confessed to Birami's murder, though it was alleged that the confession had been obtained under torture, including beatings, electric shocks, suffocation, solitary confinement and sexual violence.

Rasaei's trial started on 21 September 2023 at Criminal Court One in Kermanshah. His legal team argued that the evidence used against him came from a "flawed" criminal investigation and included testimonies from eyewitnesses who had subsequently recanted their statements, alleging that they had been obtained under torture; they also claimed that evidence that exonerated Rasaei had been disregarded by the prosecution. Rasaei denied his involvement in Birami's death, stating his confession had been extracted through torture.

On 7 October 2023, Rasaei was sentenced to death for the "premeditated murder" of Birami. Amnesty International criticised the sentence, describing the trial as a "sham", while Dadbar, a collective of lawyers representing Iranian political prisoners, criticised the trial. On 16 December 2023, Branch 17 of the Supreme Court of Iran upheld Rasaei's death sentence at an appeal hearing. On 16 January 2024, Branch 1 of the Supreme Court rejected Rasaei's request for a judicial review of his trial and the investigation into Birami's death.

Rasaei was executed at 05:00 on 6 August 2024 at Dizelabad Prison. Rasaei and his family were not given prior notice of his execution. Dadbar reported that Rasaei had maintained his innocence until his death. His family were reportedly forced to bury his body in a location far from his hometown in the presence of security forces. Amnesty International described Rasaei's execution as "an abhorrent arbitrary execution" and said he had been subjected to torture and mistreatment in detention, including sexual violence.
