= Victoria Jamali =

Iranian environmental activist

- ویکتوریا جمالی
- Citizenship: Iran
- Occupations: Academic; Environmentalist
- Known for: Women’s Society Against Environmental Pollution; Iranian Environmental Law Society

Academic background
- Education: University of Aberdeen

Academic work
- Discipline: Environmental Law
- Institutions: University of Tehran

Victoria Jamali, in Persian: ویکتوریا جمالی, is an environmental rights activist and expert in environment law from Iran. She was a founding member of the Women’s Society Against Environmental Pollution and founded the Iranian Society of Environmental Law.

== Education ==
Jamali graduated from the University of Aberdeen in 1974, with a Masters qualification in rural and regional resource planning.

== Career ==
After graduation she returned to Iran and began work at the Institute of Environmental Studies at the University of Tehran. The Institute continued despite changes wrought by the Iranian Revolution (1978-1979) and the Iran-Iraq War (1980-1988). By 1997 it was able to flourish.

Earlier in the 1990s, Jamali had been approached by her colleague at the University of Tehran, Mahlagha Mallah, to establish an organisation dedicated to women and the environment in Iran. In 1993 they founded the Women’s Society Against Environmental Pollution (WSAEP). In 1999 and 2001 she took part in two research visits to the USA sponsored by Environmental Law Alliance Worldwide.

By 2001, Jamali was Assistant Professor in the Graduate Faculty of Environment at the University of Tehran and was leading research in environmental law in Iran. She founded Iran's first society for environmental law - the Iranian Society of Environmental Law. In 2002 she founded Iran's first environmental law programme, which drew comparisons between her and the American environmentalist John Muir. In order for the programme to be passed she had to convince senior male colleague at Tehran University of its legitimacy. This Environmental Programme, begun by Jamali, had support from the Iranian Vice-President Masoomeh Ebtekar in 2003.

Jamali has been prominent in campaigns including those advocating for reduction in air pollution and protection of the Persian cheetah. She has been vocal about a lack of environmental protection in general in Iran.

As part of her work with Women’s Society Against Environmental Pollution, Jamali edits the journal فرياد زمين (Faryad-e-Zamin - Cry of the Earth). Jamali has published on environmental law as part of her research and has translated academic articles to Persian from English.

== Selected publications ==
- 'Ongoing environmental research of the University of Tehran about the city of Tehran'
- 'Traditional irrigation in Iran: Qanat'
