= Hossein Ali Mallah =

Iranian musician, painter, author (1921–1992)

- حسینعلی ملاح
- Born: 25 June 1921; Golestan province, Qajar Iran
- Died: 18 July 1992 (aged 71); Tehran, Iran
- Occupations: Musician, musicologist, music researcher, music critic, painter, author, translator
- Mother: Khadijeh Afzal Vaziri
- Relatives: Mahlagha Mallah (sister), Ali-Naqi Vaziri (maternal uncle), Bibi Khanoom Astarabadi (maternal grandmother)

Hossein Ali Mallah (Persian: حسینعلی ملاح; 25 June 1921 – 18 July 1992) was an Iranian musician, musicologist, painter, and author. He worked to connect Persia's historical poetry and music, as well as researched music and instruments.

== Early life and family ==
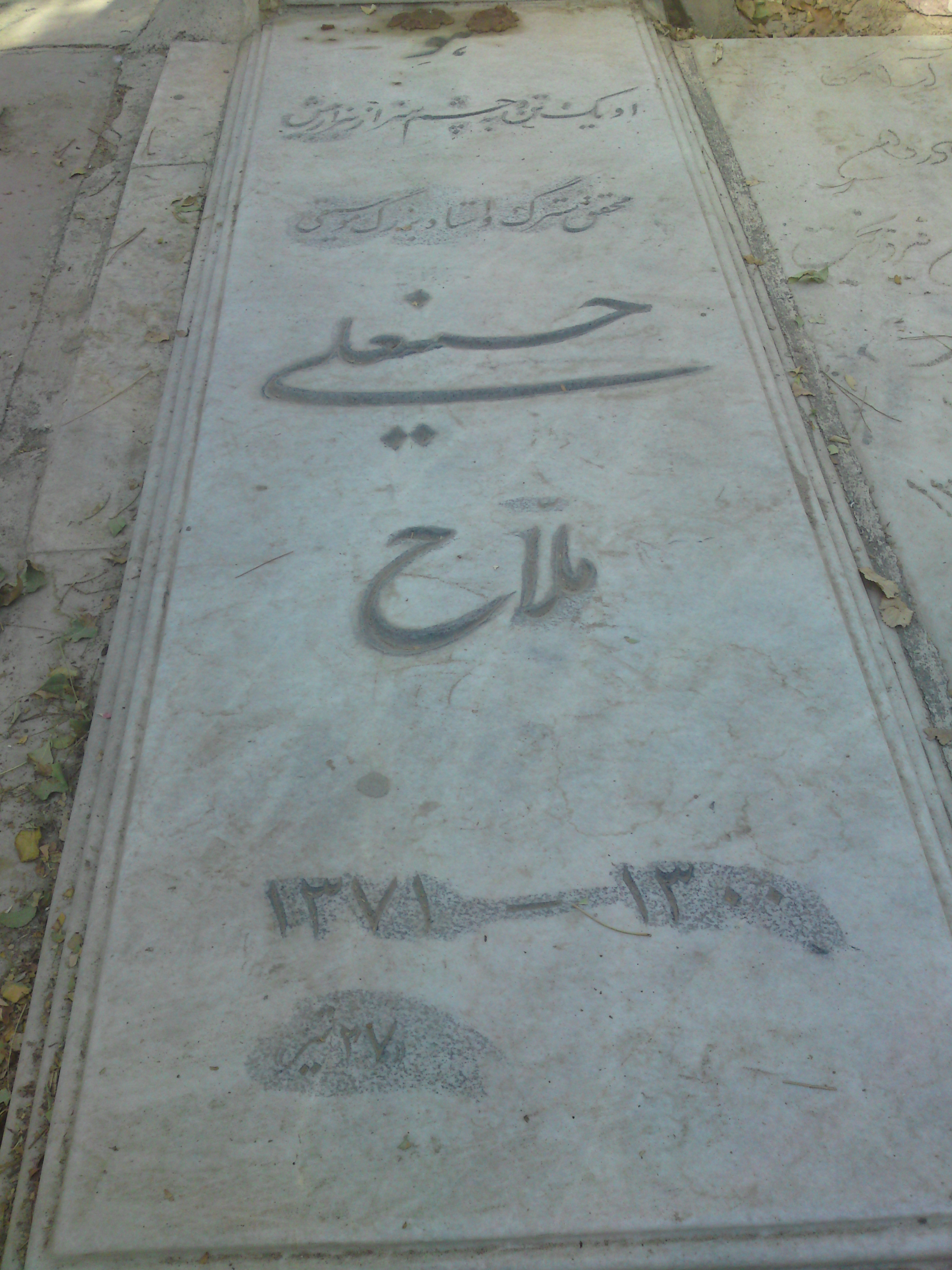
Gravestone for Mallah

Hossein Ali Mallah was born in 1921, in Golestan province, Qajar Iran. However, the exact city of his birth has been debated by sources as either Bandar-e Gaz, Tehran, or Now Kandeh.

He was one of the five children of Agha Bozur Khan Mallah, and Khadijeh Afzal Vaziri; and he was a grandson of Bibi Khanoom Astarabadi. His siblings included Mahlagha Mallah, an environmental activist; and Mehrangiz Mallah, a memoirist.

== Education and career ==
Mallah appreciated music at a young age, and started playing the violin and setar at the age of fourteen. He attended the High School of Music, where he studied under his maternal uncle, Ali-Naqi Vaziri. His other teachers included Abolhasan Saba, Hossein Yahaghi, and Ruhollah Khaleqi.

Mallah's music research including in the field of connecting poetry and music, examining old music treatises (including Jami's treatise), the historiography of different types of music, and the culture of instruments.

He was also skilled at painting portraits, two remaining portraits of Ali-Naqi Vaziri and Kamal ol-Molk still extant.

He was appointed as a member of the Council of the Music Unit, whose members consisted of: Morteza Hannaneh, Ali Tajvidi, and Habibollah Badiee.

He died in 1992, at the age of 71 of an illness in Tehran, Iran.
