= Tembor =

Uyghur string instrument

Tembor (تەمبۈر)
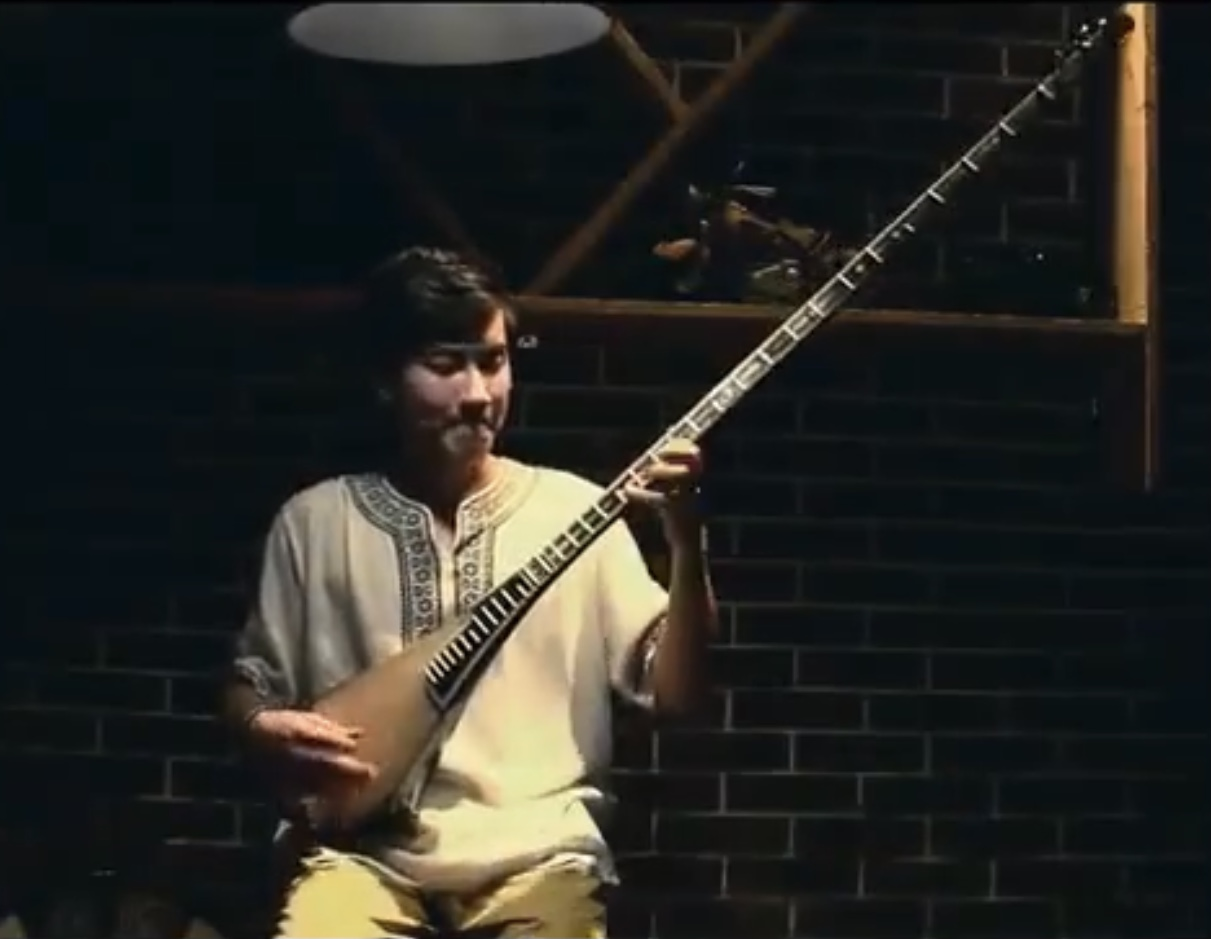
- Uyghur tambur

String instrument
- Classification: String instrument
- Hornbostel–Sachs classification: (Composite chordophone)

Related instruments
- satar, dutar, tanbur, setar

The tembor (simplified Chinese: 弹拨尔; traditional Chinese: 彈撥爾; pinyin: tánbō'ěr; Uyghur: تەمبۈر, Тембор) is a long-necked lute used in the music of Xinjiang, a diverse region of western China. Specifically, it is used by the Uyghur ethnic group.

It has five strings in three courses and is tuned A A, D, G G. The strings are made of steel and the instrument is roughly 1.5 m (59 in) long from the top of the headstock to the horn string plate at the other end. The player attaches a metal wire pick under the fingernail of the right index finger with thread. The instrument features a guard for the playing hand in the shape of a fish, and the whole instrument is, as is common with most Uyghur instruments, covered in fine marquetry in geometric designs. One of the most challenging Uyghur instruments, it is known as "the father of music". It is an important instrument in the Ili Valley, where it is used alongside the dutar and accompanies vocal performances.

== See also ==
- Sataer
