= Setor =

Stringed musical instrument

The setor (Tajik: сетор) is a stringed musical instrument played in the eastern regions of Tajikistan, within the Pamiri culture. It is a much larger instrument than the Iranian setar, and more closely resembles the Uzbek tanbur or Indian sitar.

The setor has metal strings and is played with wire fingerpicks.

The body of the setor is made like a dutar, with separate ribs. The soundboard is made of softwood, with soundholes drilled into it. The neck is wide and hollow, with a straight pegbox.

There are generally 10 metal strings, including a few extra drone strings starting from pegs half way on the left side of the neck. The frets are wound-on nylon or gut.

== See also ==
- Setar
- Sitar
- Baglama
- Chitrali sitar
