= Khatereh Parvaneh =

Classical Iranian singer

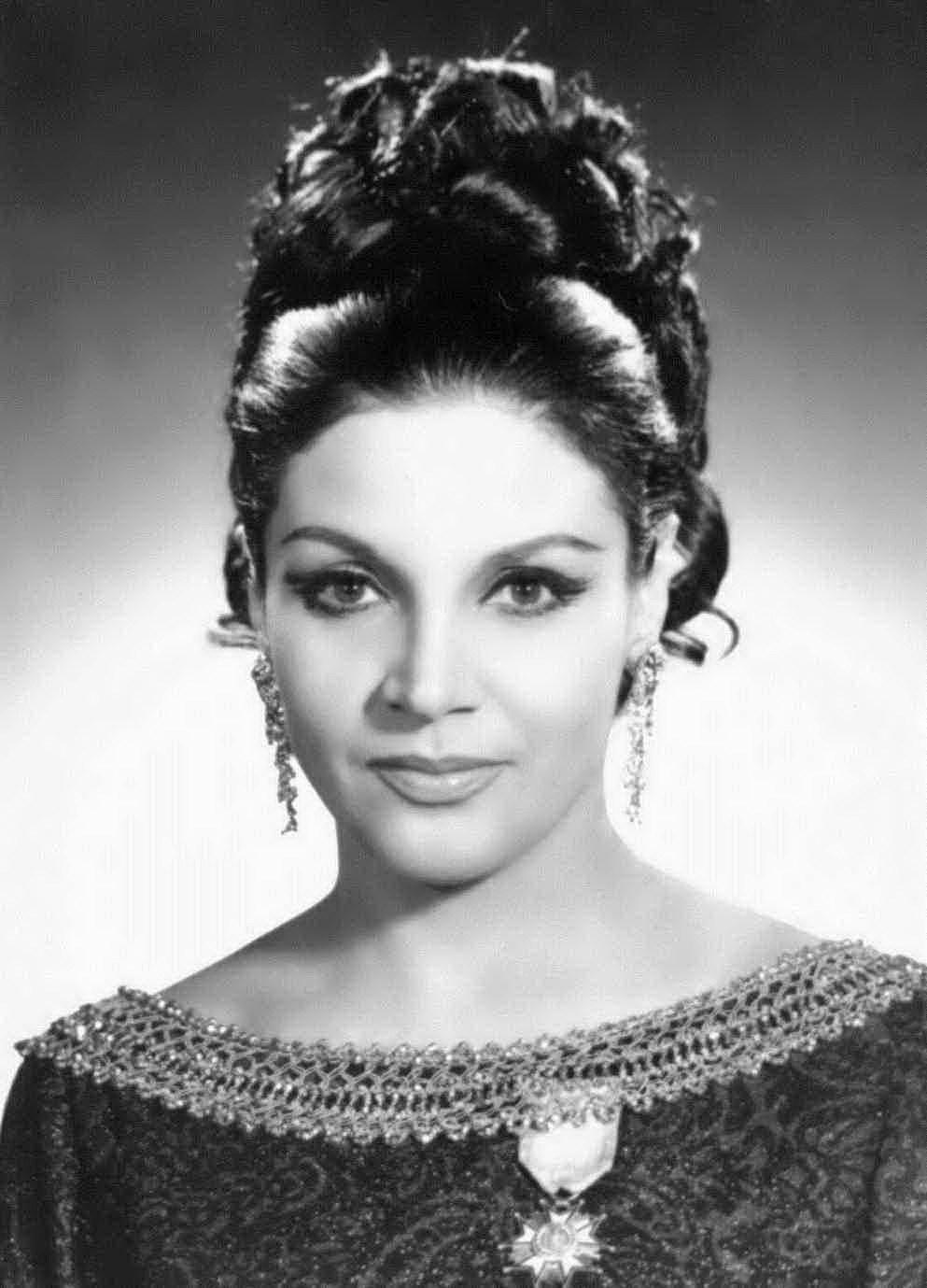
Khatereh Parvaneh in the 1970s.

Khatereh Parvaneh (1930 – 5 November 2008 in Persian: خاطره پروانه) was an Iranian singer who specialized in traditional classical music.

== Biography ==
Parvaneh was the daughter of Banoo Machol Parvaneh, a royal court singer in Iran from the Qajar era. Her mother died when Parvaneh was four, though the songs she learned from her mother formed the basis of her love of singing. Parvaneh's husband also encouraged her to sing after their marriage. She would sing the national anthem when teaching school, leading to her eventually being discovered by musician Abolhassan Saba in 1957.

Parvaneh sings traditional Iranian music. Her singing was described as "liquid-voiced" by the Idaho State Journal. Parvaneh performed at the Fajr Music Festival in 2006 and 2007.

Parvaneh died in her home in Tehran on 5 November 2008.
