= Khadijeh Afzal Vaziri =

Iranian journalist and activist (1889–1981)

- خدیجه افضل وزیری
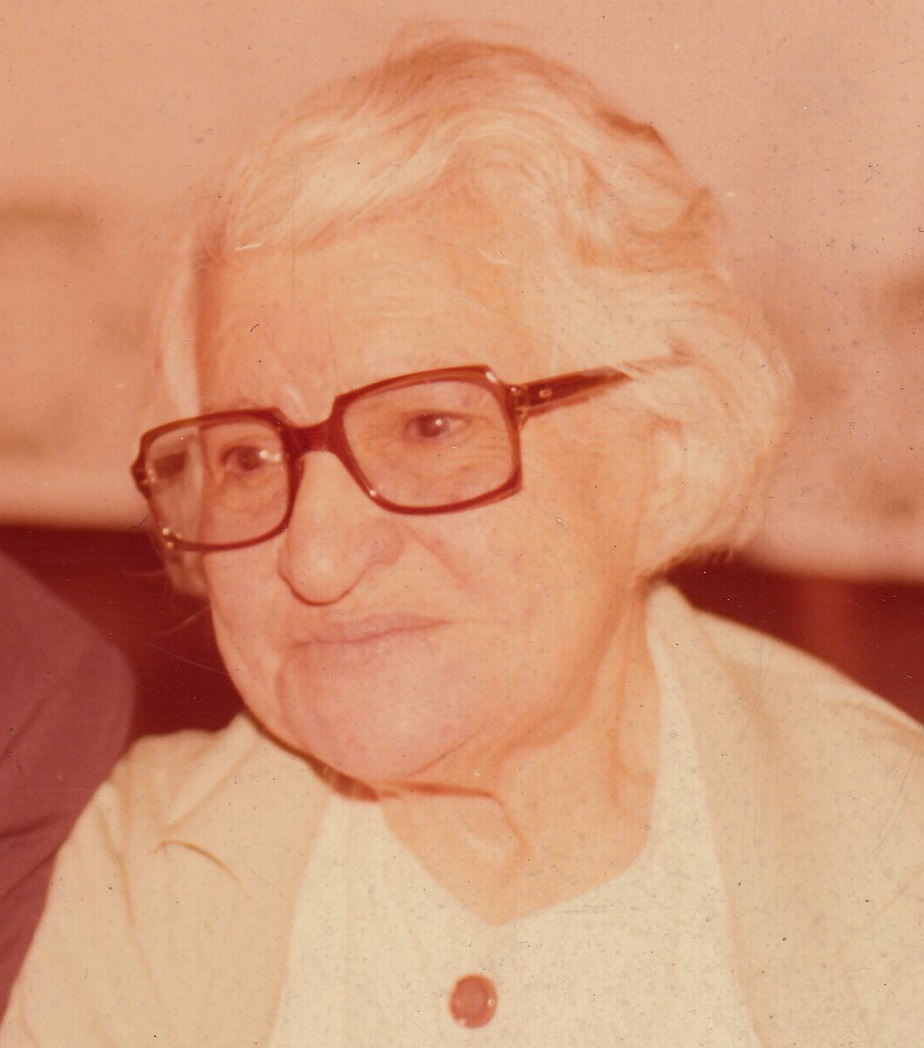
- Born: Khadijeh Afzal Khanoom; 1889; Tehran, Qajar Iran
- Died: 3 January 1981 (aged 91); Tehran, Iran
- Resting place: Behesht-e Zahra
- Occupations: Writer, teacher, women's rights activist
- Children: 5, including Mahlagha and Hossein Ali
- Parent(s): Mousa Khan Vaziri (father); Bibi Khanoom Astarabadi (mother)
- Relatives: Ali-Naqi Vaziri (brother)

Khadijeh Afzal Vaziri (Persian: خدیجه افضل وزیری; 1889 – 3 January 1981) was an Iranian women's rights activist, journalist and educator. She campaigned against the enforced wearing of the chador and supported the Kashf-e hijab.

== Early life ==
Khadijeh Afzal Khanoom was born in 1889 in Tehran, Qajar Iran and was the fifth child of Bibi Khanum Astarabadi, a women's rights activist, and Musa Khan Vaziri. According to some historical sources, when Bibi Khanum had not yet established her school, she would send her daughter to school in boys' clothes so that she could study alongside her brothers. Her siblings included: Hasan Ali Khan Wazir, Ali-Naqi Vaziri and Mowlud Khanoom who was a teacher like their mother.

When she reached the age of 16, she taught the girls at Doshizegan Elementary School, which her mother had founded, becoming one of the first teachers in Iran's first girls' school. She later taught at her sister's school too.

She married her cousin Agha Bozorg Mallah. Their children included: Mahlagha Mallah, Amir Hushang, Husayn'ali, Mehrangiz, Khusraw, and Taymur, who died when he was 11 months old. Mahlagha was born in a caravanserai whilst the family were travelling on a pilgrimage.

== Career ==
In addition to teaching, Vaziri began to write articles for newspapers on women's issues. One of her most notable articles was written for the paper Shafaq-e-Sorkh. In it she countered the attacks on women that were being published by an anonymous writer, which culminated in her writing: "Let women study and work with men, then you will see that women are no less than men". She taught throughout her life and was the director of girls' schools.

Vaziri also designed her own clothes. During the 1930s, whilst many women began to stop wearing face veils, wearing the chador remained popular. Vaziri advocated for a change in fashion alongside Sediqeh Dowlatabadi, and she designed outfits where your arms could move more freely as a result. In an open letter in 1930, Vaziri discussed how enforcing young women (aged seven or eight) to wear a chador, meant that those who did not would be removed from their schools, which would affect their educational opportunities. She was a member of the Kanoun-e-Banovan and supported the Kashf-e hijab reform against compulsory hijab (veiling).

Khadijeh Afzal Vaziri died on 1980 and was buried in section 34 of Behesht-e Zahra (Row 183, Number 35).

== Legacy ==
After her death, her daughter Mehrangiz Mallah (fa) compiled and edited her mother's oral memoirs, which were the first oral memoir of a woman who lived in pre-Revolution Iran to be published and provide important testimony on their lives.
