= Women's Society Against Environmental Pollution =

Non-governmental organization

- جامعه زنان در برابر آلودگی محیط زیست
- Abbreviation: WSAEP
- Formation: 1993; 33 years ago
- Founder: Mahlagha Mallah; Victoria Jamali
- Type: Non-governmental organisation
- Purpose: environmental rights
- Location: Iran
- Website: wsaep.org

The Women's Society Against Environmental Pollution (WSAEP, Persian: جامعه زنان در برابر آلودگی محیط زیست) is a non-governmental women's and environmental rights organisation based in Iran.

== History ==
The organisation was founded in 1993 by Mahlagha Mallah, a retired librarian from the University of Tehran, and Victoria Jamali, an expert on environmental law. Mallah's work began investigation pollution in Tehran in 1978, she then approached foreign embassies in the city in order to research international environmental movements. The 1979 Revolution and the Iran-Iraq War halted environmental progress in Iran. However by 1993, Mallah and her husband had established the society and in 1995 it was registered with the Ministry of the Interior, moving to registration with the Department of Environment. This registration enables the organisation to work openly, but is not an endorsement by the government, however it does prohibit WSAEP from criticising it. This means that their campaigns are phrased as "technical" rather than political issues.

The first WSAEP branch was established in Isfahan. Although WSAEP is a society which emphasises the role that women play in environmental issues, men can also be members.

== Campaigns ==
WSAEP has campaigned for better air quality in Tehran since 2001, advocating for a reduction in the number of old cars on the road and a ban on cars to driven if they only have the driver in them. The Society organised demonstrations which also involved local children. Under the influence of Victoria Jamali, the Society has campaigned for western-style environmental laws. They also produce free educational resources, aiming to improve public awareness of the environmental challenges Iran faces.

Working with women to create goods from recycled materials is another strand of WSAEP's work. The society emphasises the importance of women since they control what happens in households, where key decisions about recycling and pollution rest. WSAEP has also been instrumental in campaigning for a family-planning programme in Iran.

The organisation publishes the journal فرياد زامين(Faryad-e-Zamin - Cry of the Earth), which is edited by Victoria Jamali. As of 2015, it had educated over 25,000 families in recycling and waste management. It established a young people's programme – the Earth's Fans Society – which provides environmental education in schools and kindergartens. They have worked with universities to ratify the inclusion of an optional course in environmental management in degrees, as well as providing training for civil servants in rural areas.

== Awards ==
In 2016, the Isfahan WSAEP branch was awarded Iran's National Environmental Award.

== Legacy ==
The work of WSAEP has been described as "non-threatening" to the government, despite their efficiency in the field they do campaign in.
