= Sataer =

Uyghur string instrument

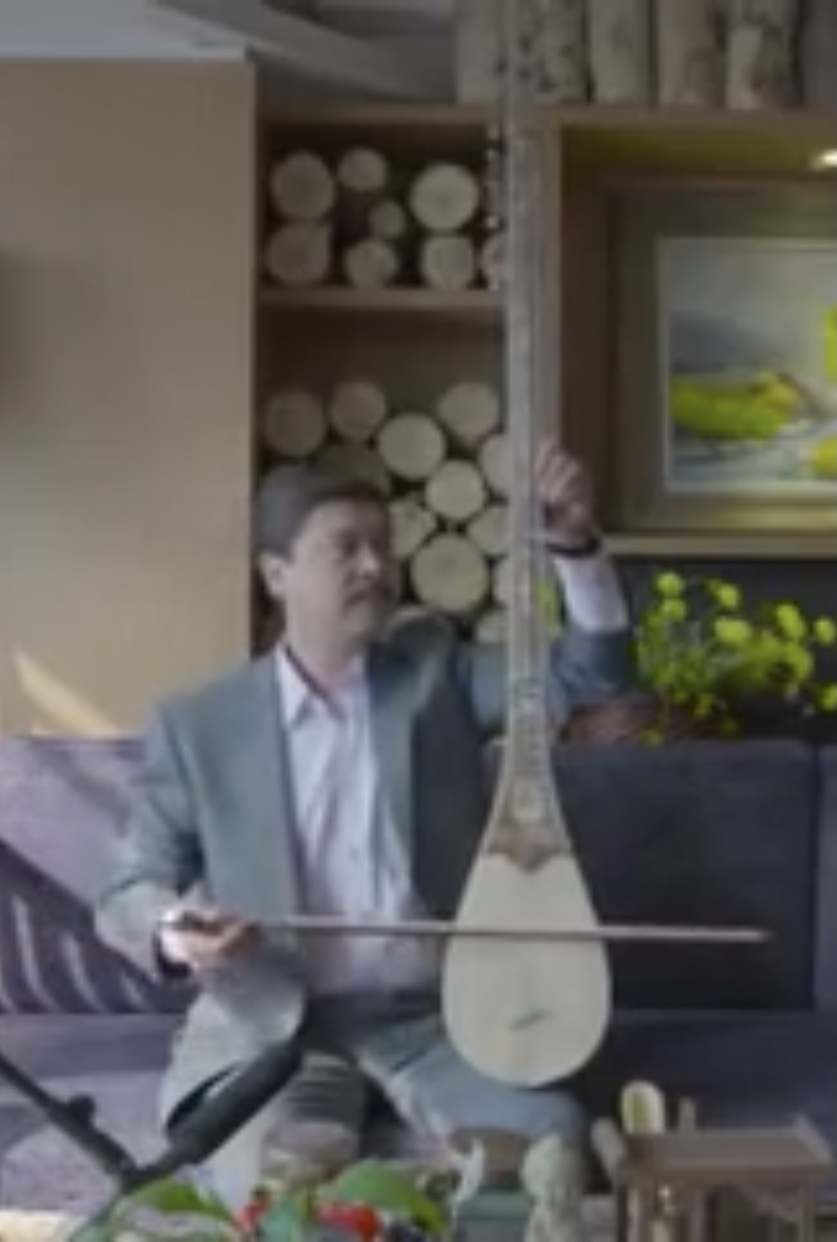
- Uyghur satar or sataer (ساتار)

String instrument
- Classification: string instrument

Related instruments
- Dutar; Setar; Tanbur; Tembor

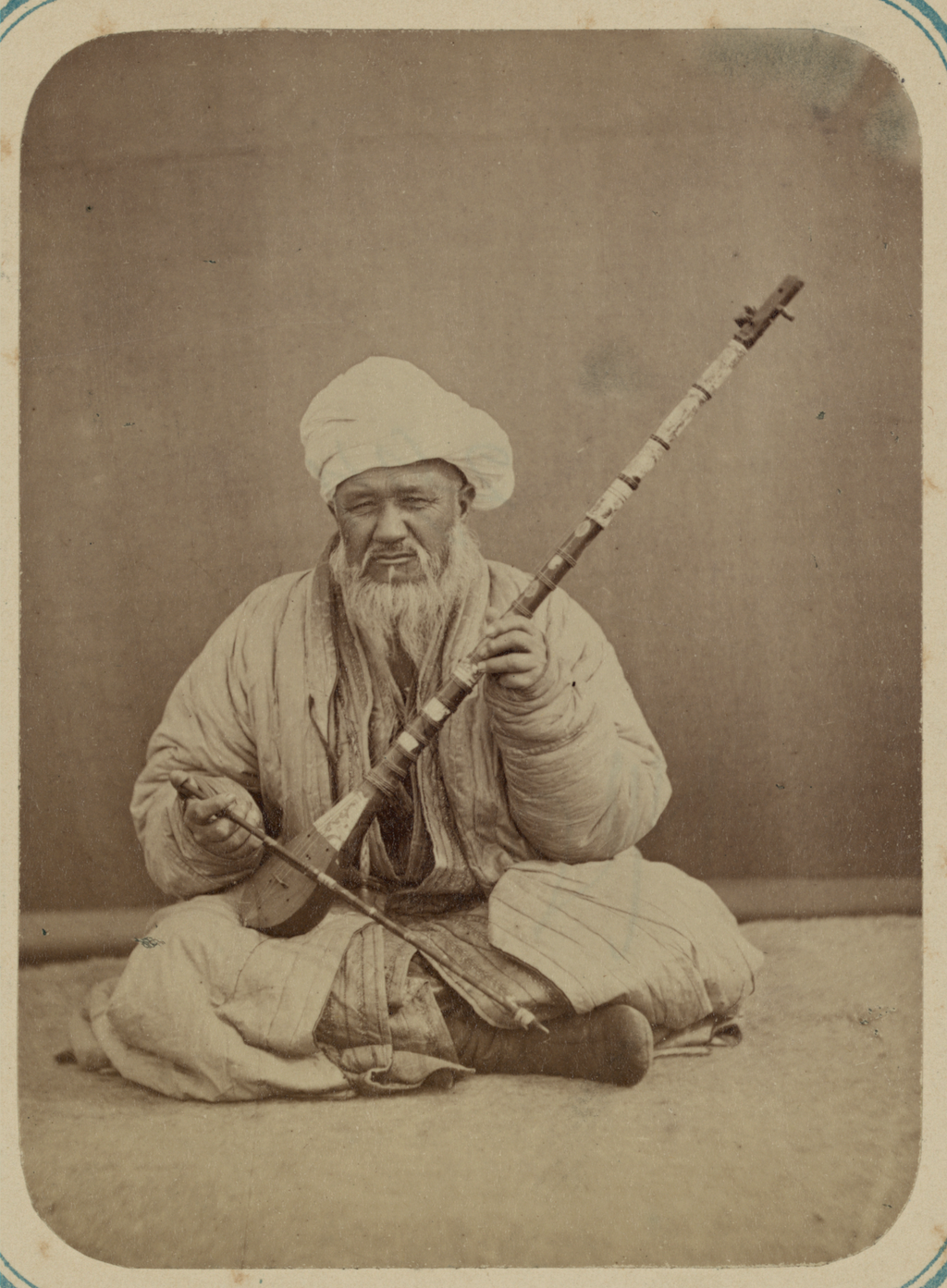
The instrument lacks the modern sataer's sympathetic strings, the 12 frets on the soundboard, and the bridge placed at an angle, with the main strings raised separately from the sympathetic strings. It does have the sataer's tanbur or setar-like shape and length. It is also 3-stringed, the original meaning of setar. 1860s, Turkestan

The Sataer (Uyghur: ساتار, сатар; Chinese: 萨它尔) (Note: The Chinese translation—萨塔尔, sàtǎ'ěr—is a transliteration of the original Persian loanword (via Uyghur).) is a traditional Uyghur long-necked bowed lute. It is used by Uyghur people in Xinjiang, western China, and is an important instrument to play maqams.

== Characteristics ==
The instrument is a long-necked lute, about 140 cm long, with a bowl about 16.5 cm at the widest point, about 15 cm deep. The neck is fretted with 18 tied frets, which may be made of string rather that the inlaid metal frets of western instruments. The soundboard has additionally frets laid on it under the main melody string, approximately 11 or 12 frets.

The sataer is strung with between 9 and 17 sympathetic strings which are not played directly but vibrate in reaction to the melody string, in sympathetic resonance.

A single melody string is set apart from the sympathetic strings. This is the string that the musician manipulates on the instrument's neck, fretting it to change the notes as the string is bowed.

On modern instruments, the bridge is set on the soundboard near the bottom at an approximately 45-degree angle, instead of set straight across the soundboard.

A shorter version, about 120 centimeters long, is known as the alto sataer (中音萨它尔).

== Tuning ==
The main string of the instrument is set in relation to the lead singer's voice, singing the 12 maqams. The string is set approximately to:

c-c2 or d-d2

For an instrument using 12 sympathetic strings, the strings may be tuned:

G, c, d, e, g, a, c1, d1, e1, g1, a1, c2

or

c, d, e, g, a, c1, d1, e1, g1, a1, c2, d2.

== See also ==
- Setar
- Chinese music
- List of Chinese musical instruments
