= Forough Azarakhshi =

Iranian activist

Forough Āzarakhsh'i (Persian: فروغ آذرخشی 1904 in Arak, Iran – 1963 in Mashhad (?), Iran) established the first elementary and secondary schools for girls in Mashhad, Iran, of which the former became known as "Forough's School" ("مدرسه فروغ").

Forough Āzarakhsh'i dwelt with the hostility of traditionalists. Upon establishing "Forough's School", some religious extremists threatened to set fire to this school, which was held at her private home. To counter this threat, she, along with her children and members of her extended family, protected the school by the force of arms, a measure that was kept in place for two years. The problem was ultimately resolved as a result of Forough's discussions with the religious leaders of Mashhad, who at first had considered presence of girls in a school environment as being against religious teachings. Having convinced the citizens that studying would not be deleterious to women, the School for Women (مدرسه بانوان) in Mashhad was formally inaugurated.

Other Forough Āzarakhsh'i's community contributions include her presidency at the Children Orphanage (پرورشگاه) of Khorasan, her work with the Association for the Protection of Mothers and Children (بنگاه حمایت از مادران و نوزادان), and her work with a Charity Commission (بنیاد نیکوکاری). She was also the honorary president of the Red Lion and Sun Society of Iran (جمعیت شیرو خورشید سرخ ایران) in Mashhad.

== See also ==
- Bibi Khatoon Astarabadi
- Farrokhroo Pārsā
- Persian women's movement
