= Sori (music) =

Symbol used in traditional Persian music

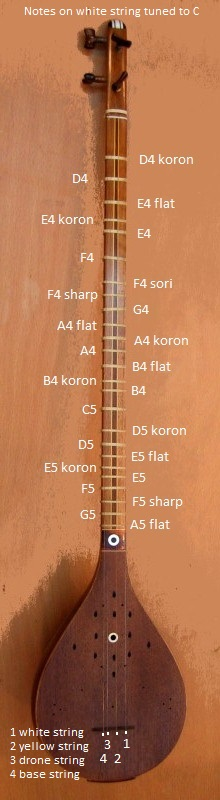
Notes for the white string of a on a 25-fret Setar,tuned to C. Instrument has both koron and sori notes.

The sori (Persian: سُری) is a symbol that corresponds to a quarter step higher in tone in Persian traditional music. It is written as a ">" sign, crossed by two vertical lines, and can be used like an accidental.

In the early 20th century, Iranian master musician Ali-Naqi Vaziri established this sign for the sori for use in written Persian music using standard western notation.

Character representation of this accidental together with the koron microtone used in modern Iranian classical music were added to the Unicode standard in Version 14.0 as U+1D1E9 and U+1D1EA, respectively.

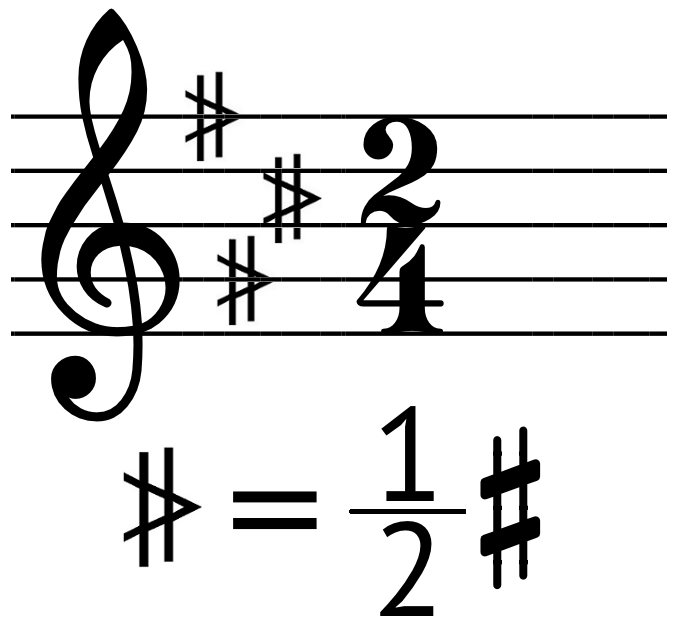
Sori used in musical notation

== See also ==
- Persian traditional music
- Dastgah
- Quarter tone
- koron
