= Ali-Naqi Vaziri =

Iranian musician (1886–1979)

- علینقی وزيری
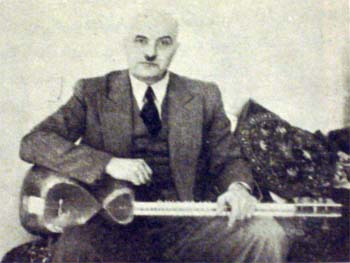
- Born: Ali Naqi Vaziri; 1 October 1886; Tehran, Qajar Iran
- Died: 9 September 1979 (aged 92); Tehran, Iran
- Other names: Colonel Vaziri, Alinaghi Vaziri
- Occupations: player of the tar composer musicologist, professor
- Years active: 1925–1979
- Known for: Persian music
- Mother: Bibi Khanoom Astarabadi
- Relatives: Khadijeh Afzal Vaziri (sister), Hossein Ali Mallah (nephew), Mahlagha Mallah (niece)

Ali-Naqi Vaziri (Persian: علی نقی وزیری; 1 October 1886 in Tehran – 9 September 1979), also transcribed as Ali Naghi Vaziri, was a composer, thinker, and celebrated player of the tar. He is considered a revolutionary icon in the history of 20th-century Persian music.

Ali-Naqi Vaziri was born on 1 October 1886, in Tehran, Qajar Iran. He was one of the seven children of Musa Khan Vaziri (a prominent official in the Persian Cossack Brigade) and Bibi Khanoom Astarabadi, a notable Iranian writer, satirist, and a pioneering figure in the women's movement of Iran; her book Ma'ayeb al-Rejal (Failings of Men, also translated as Vices of Men) is considered by some as the first declaration of women's rights in the modern history of Iran. The celebrated painter Hassan Ali Khan Vaziri was his brother.

Ali-Naqi Vaziri was a master of Persian classical music, so he was able to play the tar in a style very reminiscent of that of Mirza Abdollah. He always looked for new dimensions and perspectives in musical expression, and by doing so he revolutionised the style of playing the tar.

He was the first to transcribe the classical radif of the Persian music. He developed the sori and koron symbols to annotate Persian quarter-tone notes in standardized musical notation.

Vaziri for years was the director of the Tehran Conservatory of Music and a professor at the University of Tehran.

== Innovations ==
Vaziri was one the first Persian musicians in the 20th century to go to Europe to study music, and after his return to Tehran in 1924.

He was for a long time the only traditional instrumentalist familiar with and promoted the theory of Western classical music.

He wrote the first transcription of Iranian music using European staff notation in his lute instruction book Dastur-e Tar, published in Iran (1913) and Germany (1923). It contained material from the Iranian oral classical canon (known as the radif), as well as arrangements inspired by composers like Beethoven, Rossini, and Schubert.

Vaziri was the first to introduce and promote equal moderation in classical Persian music; in this way, each octave was evenly divided into 24 notes. This method made it possible to use Western system to harmonise traditional Persian melodies. His experiments with musical scale was work in the direction of blending Western polyphony into Persian music.

His creation of the 24 step scale was created "with the intention of accommodating the application of Western harmony to musical compositions within Persian modes." He first described this view briefly in The Grammar and then in more detail in Theoretical Music.

He invented a new Persian music notation for accidentals, calling the additions sori and koron; the first raises the bottom of a note by a quarter of a step and the second lowers it by a quarter of a step. Vaziri's theory for classical Persian music was heavily rejected since the 1960s.

Vaziri trained students, some of whom became famous in Persian music, including: Abolhassan Saba, Ruhollah Khaleghi, Javad Maroufi, Heshmat Sanjari.

He invited some artists of his time (such as Ali Dashti, Ali-Akbar Dehkhoda, Gholamreza Rashid-Yasemi, Badiozzaman Forouzanfar and Hassan Taqizadeh) together to establish an "Academy of Fine Arts" with the aim of collecting a culture of musical words and which may have become the basis for the formation of the Academy of Persian Language and Literature.
