= Bibi Khanoom Astarabadi =

Iranian writer, satirist, and pioneering figure in the women's movement of Iran

- بی بی خانم استرآبادی
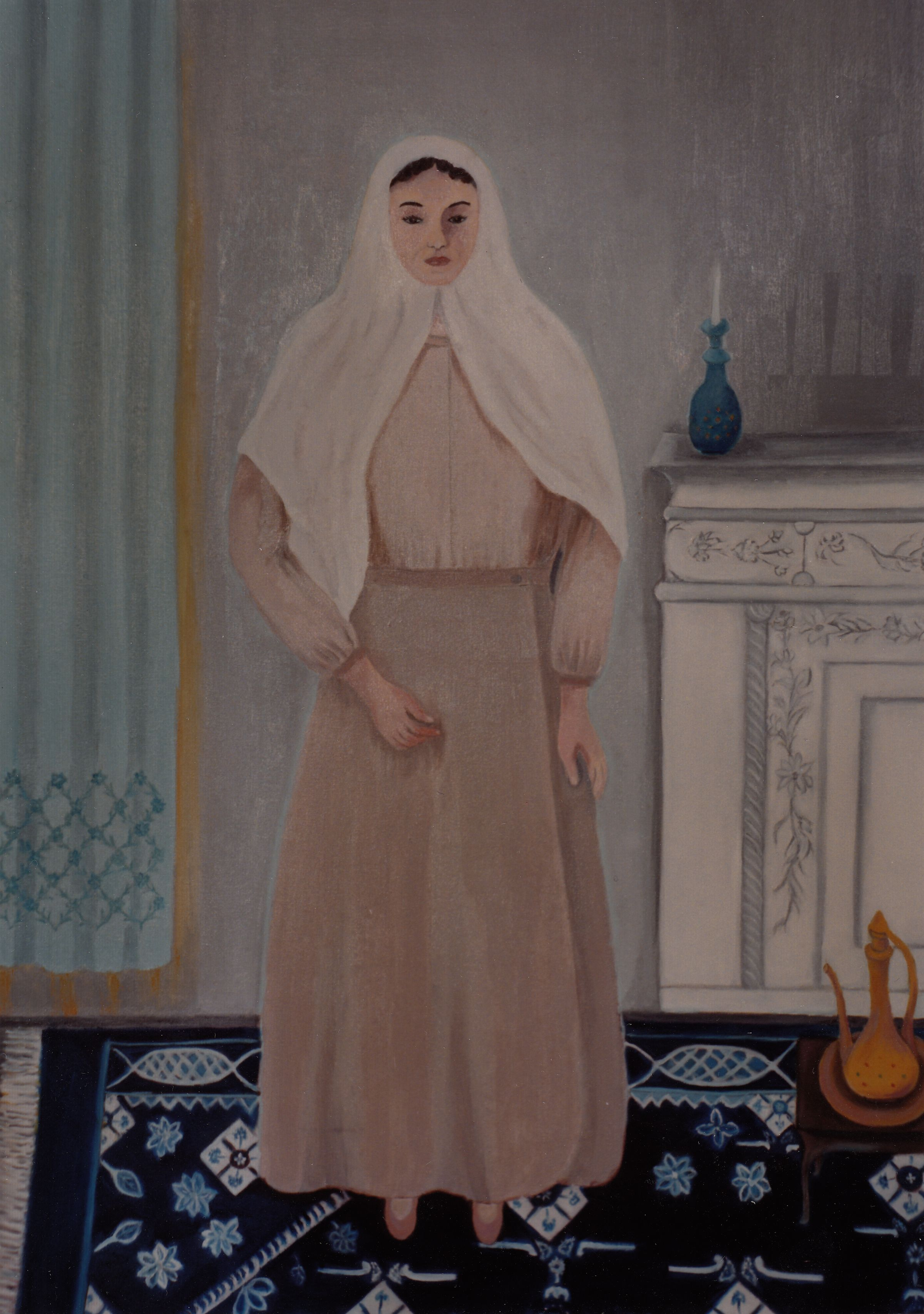
- Portrait of Bibi Khanoom Astarabadi by Mehrangiz Mallah
- Born: c. 1858; Astarabad, Qajar Iran
- Died: 1921 (aged 63); Tehran, Qajar Iran
- Occupations: Writer; activist; satirist; educator; school founder
- Movement: Women's movement of Iran, democracy activist
- Spouse: Musa Khan Vaziri
- Children: 7, including Ali-Naqi Vaziri, Khadijeh Afzal Vaziri
- Relatives: Mahlagha Mallah (granddaughter), Hossein Ali Mallah (grandson); Mehrangiz Mallah (granddaughter)

Bibi Khanoom Astarabadi (Persian: بی بی خانم استرآبادی, romanized: Bibi Khānoom Astarābādi; c. 1858 – 1921) was an Iranian writer, satirist, and a pioneering figure in the women's movement of Iran.

== Early life ==
Bibi Khatoon Astarabadi was born c. 1858/59 in Astarabad, Qajar Iran (present-day, Gorgan, Iran). Her father, Mohammad Baqer Khan Astarabadi, was a notable man in Astarabad, and her mother Khadijeh Khanom (Persian: خديجه خانم) known as Mollah Bāji (Persian: ملاباجی), was a companion of Shokuh ol-Saltaneh (Persian: شکوه السلطنه) and was in charge of the children's education in the court of Naser al-Din Shah Qajar.

== Career ==
Bibi Khatoon was one of the influential figures of the Iranian constitutional revolution in the late 19th and the early 20th century. She founded the first school for girls (named The School for Girls – دبستان دوشیزگان) in the modern history of Iran and wrote numerous articles in defence of the right of girls to receive universal education. Her articles appeared in such newspapers as Tamaddon (تمدن – Civilization), Habl al-Matin (حبل المتين – Firm Rope) and Majles (مجلس – Parliament). Bibi Khatoon is also known for her book Ma'ayeb al-Rejal (معايب الرجال – Failings of Men), which was a critical response to the pamphlet Ta'deeb al-Nesvan (تاديب النسوان – Edification of Women) by an anonymous author. Ma'ayeb al-Rejal was published in 1895, eleven years before the inauguration of Iran's system of constitutional monarchy in 1906 by the decree of Mozaffar ad-Din Shah Qajar. This book is considered by some as the first declaration of women's rights in the recent history of Iran.

== The School for Girls ==
The School for Girls (دبستان دوشیزگان) was founded in 1907 at the residential home of Bibi Khatoon in Tehran, many young girls and their mothers attended The School for Girls, as well as grandmothers. For some of the latter, it was a unique opportunity to obtain formal education. The school was equipped with such facilities (such as desks) as may be taken for granted from the present-day perspective; however, it should be borne in mind that this school provision was part of Bibi Khatoon's residential home and not part of a purpose-built educational facility. This clearly testifies to Bibi Khatoon's wholehearted dedication to the cause of women's education in Iran.

Advertisement
The School for Girls

A new school, named The School for Girls [دبستان دوشیزگان], has been opened near the old gate of Mahmmadieh, the Hāji Mohammad-Hossein market. This school consists of a large courtyard and numerous rooms equipped with all necessary school outfits.

For the opening of this school five female teachers [معلمه] have been appointed, each responsible for one subject, such as Nokhost-nameh [نخست نامه], Writing/Calligraphy [مشق قلم], History of Iran [تاریخ ایران], Reading [قرائت], Cookery book [کتاب طباخی], Law [قانون], Religion [مذهب], Geography [جغرافیا], Science of Arithmetic [علم حساب]. Teaching will be adapted to the learning ability of each girl or woman.

In addition, a location has been set aside for teaching in manual arts, such as knitting [کاموا دوزی], gold embroidery [زری دوزی], silk embroidery [خامه دوزی], sewing [خیاطی], etc., and all these teachers are womenfolk [طایفه اناثیه] and with the exception of an aged porter [پیرمرد قاپوچی], no other man will be in the School.

Students between the ages of seven and twelve will be accepted. Elementary class [اطاق ابتدائی] is for fifteen qeran per month, practical class [اطاق عملی] for twenty-five qeran per month. Discount is offered to those in reduced circumstances [فقرأ]. For every two students [from the same family] one will be accepted free of charge. It is hoped that thousands of schools such as this one are to be inaugurated in our dear motherland [وطن عزیز ما].

Signature: Bibi Khanom Astarabadi. (Published in the Majles daily newspaper of 28 March 1907).

The subjects taught at this school consisted of, in alphabetic order, Arabic language, Arithmetic, Cookery, Geography, History, Law, Music, Persian literature, and Religion, to name but some. It is relevant to point out that in 1936, almost thirty years after the establishment of The School for Girls, 12 women were for the first time admitted to the University of Tehran, who entered all faculties. According to the official data provided by Iran's ministry of higher education, at the turn of the present century some 70% of all students in higher education were women; according to the same data, however, by the same time only 20% of the PhD positions at academic institutions were occupied by women.

The historical site of The School for Girls survived in its original form for some 22 years following the death of Bibi Khatoon in 1921; in 1943 this site was sold (for 25,000 Tumans) by the extant members of Bibi Khatoon's direct family.

== On Ta'deeb al-Nesvan ==
According to Ebrahim Nabavi, Ta'deeb al-Nesvan (تاديب النسوان – Edification of Women), published in 1288 AH (1895), is a small booklet authored by one of the princes of the Qajar Court, "who must have feared his wife so greatly that he has not had the courage to put his name on it as its author" (in other words, the author of the book is an anonymous prince). A short summary of the main recommendations in this book, aimed at the "edification" of women, is as follows:

1. Woman is a being who similar to a child must be educated by a man.
2. Salvation of woman is conditional upon her absolute obedience to her husband.
3. Woman must never ask a favour from her husband; it is up to husband to deign to confer favours to his wife.
4. The duty of woman at home is provision of conditions that are conducive to her husband's tranquility.
5. The aim of matrimony consists of gratification of the husband's sexual desires.
6. Woman must at all times be abashed, except in bed.
7. Woman must not speak during meals.
8. Woman must, like an ailing individual, walk slowly.

Etc.

The Vices of Men (Ma'ayib al-Rijal, 1887), a pungent satire, is in fact an answer to an earlier work entitled The Education of Women (Ta'dib al-Niswan (translated into English by E. Powys Mathers in his Eastern Love, vol. iii, London, 1904). The anonymous writer of the latter seems to be a chauvinistic prince, and following the medieval tradition that was not accepted by Shia Muslim clerics. Bibi Khanum's answers to such absurdities are scathingly indignant. She writes that "genius of the world and unique writer of our times" seems strangely bereft of his senses. "He should have first corrected his own vices and then given us advice. One who has no share of existence, how can he inspire life? ...He regards himself as 'Westernized' and 'civilized,' but in fact, he is not even 'half-civilized.' (سیویلیزه و نیم ویلیزه) Does he not know that Europeans treat their women like flowers, and women freely associate with men?" The indication that the author was westernised clearly indicates, he must have been from the so-called western influenced intellectuals. Strangely enough at the time women had very few rights in the west in comparison to Iran and only in some parts of the western world had been able to claim their rights to inheritance.

These two works were published by Hasan Javadi as Two Qajar Essays on Men and Women: Ta'dib al-Nivan and Ma'ayib al-Rijal in Washington in 1992.

== Response of Bibi Khatoon: Ma'ayeb al-Rejal ==
According to Ebrahim Nabavi, Ma'ayeb al-Rejal (معايب الرجال – Failings of Men) consists of two main parts, in one of which Bibi Khatoon responds directly to the contents of Ta'deeb al-Nesvan, and in the other she describes the conditions prevailing in the men's social gatherings of her time. True to her usual style of writing, Bibi Khatoon's tone in this book is derisive. [To be extended at a later occasion.]

== Personal life ==
At the age of 22, Bibi Khatoon married Musa Khan Vaziri who was a prominent official in the Persian Cossack Brigade. They had seven children, of whom the most distinguished are Colonel Ali-Naqi Vaziri (musicologist, composer, a celebrated player of the tar, and the founder of the Academy of Music of Iran as well of Iran's National Orchestra), Hasan Vaziri (an artistic painter) and the journalist, Khadijeh Afzal Vaziri. Dr Mahlaghā Mallah (دكتر مه لقا ملاح), founder and director of Iran's "Women's Society against Environmental Pollution" (founded in 1992 to educate children and mothers, as well as state's officials, about dangers of environmental pollution) was the maternal granddaughter of Bibi Khatoon Astarabadi. Hossein Ali Mallah, a Persian musicologist, painter, and author was the maternal grandson of Bibi Khatoon Astarabadi.

In 1921, Bibi Khanoom died aged between 61 and 63 in Tehran.

== See also ==
- Forough Azarakhshi
- Farrokhroo Pārsā
- Intellectual movements in Iran
- Women in Iran
- One Million Signatures
- Persian Constitutional Revolution
- Women's rights movement in Iran
