= Seyed Khalil Alinezhad =

- Born: 11 June 1958; Sahneh, Kermanshah province, Iran
- Died: 18 November 2001 (aged 43) Gothenburg, Sweden
- Genre: Traditional
- Occupations: Singer-songwriter, musician, composer
- Instruments: Vocals, tanbur
- Years active: 1980s–1990s

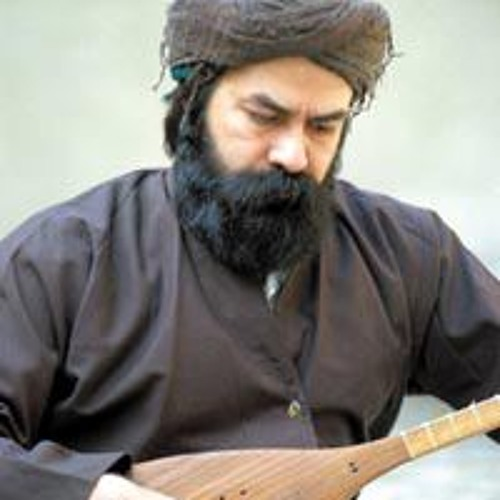
seyed khaili Alinezhad

Seyed Khalil Alinezhad (alternative spelling: Seyyed Khalil Alinejad; Kurdish: سەید خەلیل عالینژاد, born 1958, Sahneh, Kermanshah province, Iran – 2001, Gothenburg, Sweden) was a musician who played the tanbur, recognized as one of the best players of this musical instrument ever known.

== Biography ==
Seyed Khalil was born in a Kurdish family in a Sahneh County village in the Kermanshah Province, in western Iran. He started his tanbur lessons with Seyed Nader Taheri and followed his studies under supervisions of Seyed Amrollah Shah Ebrahimi, Dervish Amir Hayati, and Abedin Khademi. He finished his academic studies in the 1970s from University of Tehran with a thesis titled "Tanbur – from the very beginning till now" (تنبور از دیر باز تا کنون).

During his lifetime he became known as a spiritual leader of the mystic religion Ahl-e Haqq (People of truth), a religious tradition related to Sufism, Shia Islam, and Alevi traditions.

He is considered by many the very greatest tanbur player of the 20th century. At the beginning of 80s he joined the Shams Ensemble. In the mid-1980s he established a musical group named “Baba Taher Ensemble (بابا طاهر ). During his life, besides performing his composed solo masterpieces he also had many cooperative performances. He still has many supporters, those who enjoy his spiritual and holy songs, and those who enjoy his masterpieces.

At the end of 80s he left his hometown for Tehran and from Tehran to Sweden. In 2001, he was murdered and then burnt in fire in Gothenburg, Sweden. The reasons of his murder were not completely investigated, Some Iranians believe he was killed by his Ahle Haq rivals, but the more popular belief is that he was killed by islamic republic government agents; neither position has been proven. His body was buried in Sahneh County.

== Albums ==
- Sheyda (شیدا)
- Shokraneh – A collaboration with Hamidreza Khojandi (شکرانه – با همکاری: حمیدرضا خجندی)
- https://music.apple.com/gb/album/shokraneh/677459850
- Aein-e-Mastan (ایین-مستان)
- Navay-e-Ghalandari (نوای قلندری)
- Hemasi (حماسی)
- Zemzemeh Ghalandari (زمزمه قلندری)
- Sanay-e-Ali (ثنای علی)
- Hal-e-Khonin Delan (حال خونین دلان )
- Bigharar (بیقرار)
- SamaA-e-Sar-Mastan (سماع سر مستان)
- Ghoghnoos (ققنوس )
- Taknavazi (تکنوازی)
- Javab-e-Avaz (جواب آواز)-+

== Aein-e-Mastan Music translation ==
The title "Aeen-e Mastan" translates to "The Ritual of the Drunken" or "The Ritual of the Intoxicated" in English. In this context, 'intoxicated' doesn't necessarily mean physically inebriated; it often refers to a spiritual or mystical ecstasy, common in Sufi and other spiritual poetry and music that celebrates the abandonment of the self in the divine presence.

1. من از آنکه گردم زمستی هلاک "I am doomed by my intoxication." This speaks of being overwhelmed or 'destroyed' by a spiritual intoxication, a common metaphor in Sufi poetry for being consumed by divine love.
2. به آیین مستان بریدم به خاک "In the ritual of the intoxicated, I fell to the earth." It describes surrendering to a spiritual state, following the 'ritual' or practices of those spiritually 'intoxicated' (deeply connected with the divine).
3. به آب خرابات غسلم دهید "Wash me with the water of the tavern." The 'tavern' (خرابات) is another Sufi symbol, representing a place of spiritual ruin but also of transformation—outside the norms of society. The request to be washed with its water suggests a cleansing through spiritual means rather than conventional religious rites.
4. پس آنگاه بر دوش مستم دهید "Then, carry my intoxicated body on your shoulders." This is a request for his body to be carried by those who are spiritually intoxicated, emphasizing the community of like-minded souls.
5. به تابوتی از چوب تاکم کنید "Place me in a coffin of vine wood." The vine symbolizes both the growth and the wine made from grapes, another metaphor for divine intoxication.
6. به راه خرابات خاکم کنید "Bury me in the path of the tavern." This is a wish to be buried in a path that symbolizes continuous spiritual journey and transformation.
7. مریزید بر گور من جز شراب "Pour nothing but wine on my grave." Wine here symbolizes divine knowledge and ecstasy, not literal alcohol.
8. میارید در ماتمم جز رباب "Bring nothing to my mourning but a rebab." The rebab is a traditional stringed instrument, suggesting that his mourning should be filled with music rather than tears.
9. مبادا عزیزان که در مرگ من "Let not my loved ones at my death,"
10. بنالد به جز مطرب و چنگ زن "Cry out except for the musician and harpist." This continues the theme of celebrating his departure with music rather than sorrow.
11. تو خود حافظ سر زمستی متاب "You yourself, guard your head from sobriety." This is a directive to maintain a state of spiritual 'intoxication'—to remain immersed in divine love.
12. که سلطان نخواهد خراج از خراب "For the sultan does not seek tribute from the ruined." This line emphasizes that spiritual ruin (i.e., complete surrender to the divine) places one beyond the material demands of the world, including those of a sultan or king.

== See also ==
Mala Pareshan
