= Chitrali sitar =

Musical instrument from Pakistan

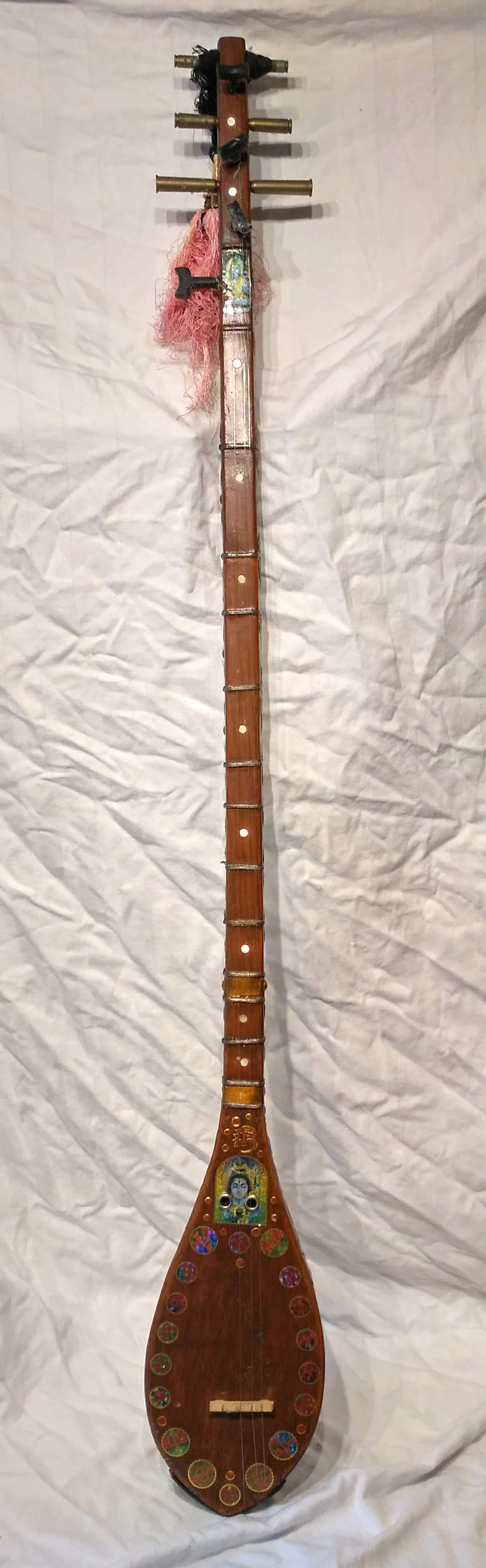
Chitrali sitar. Front view.

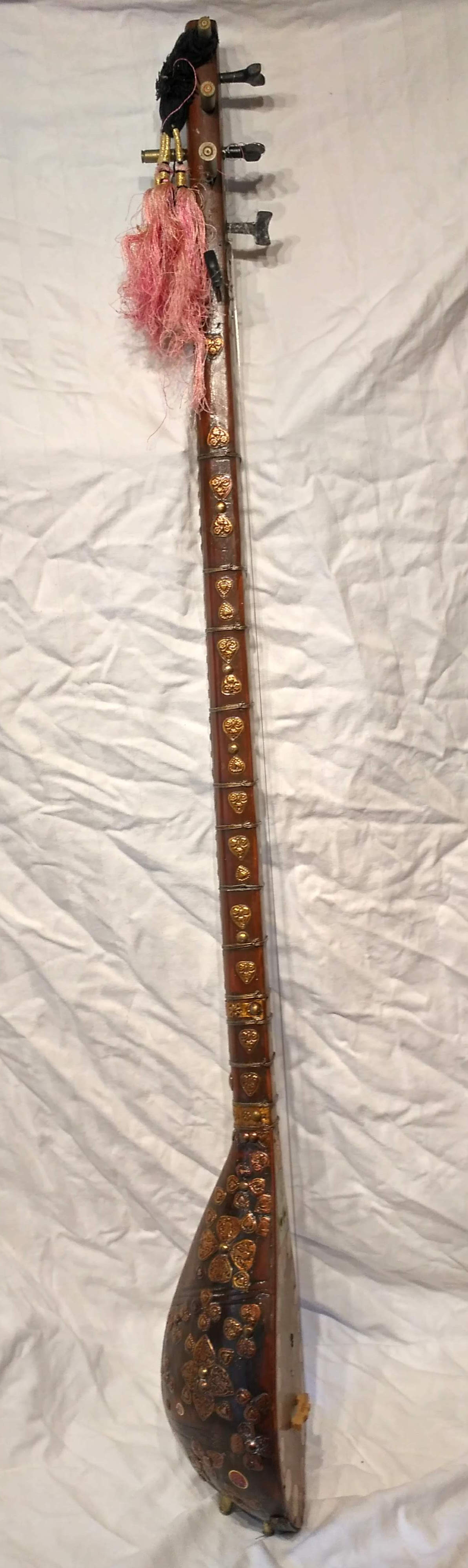
Chitrali sitar. Side view.

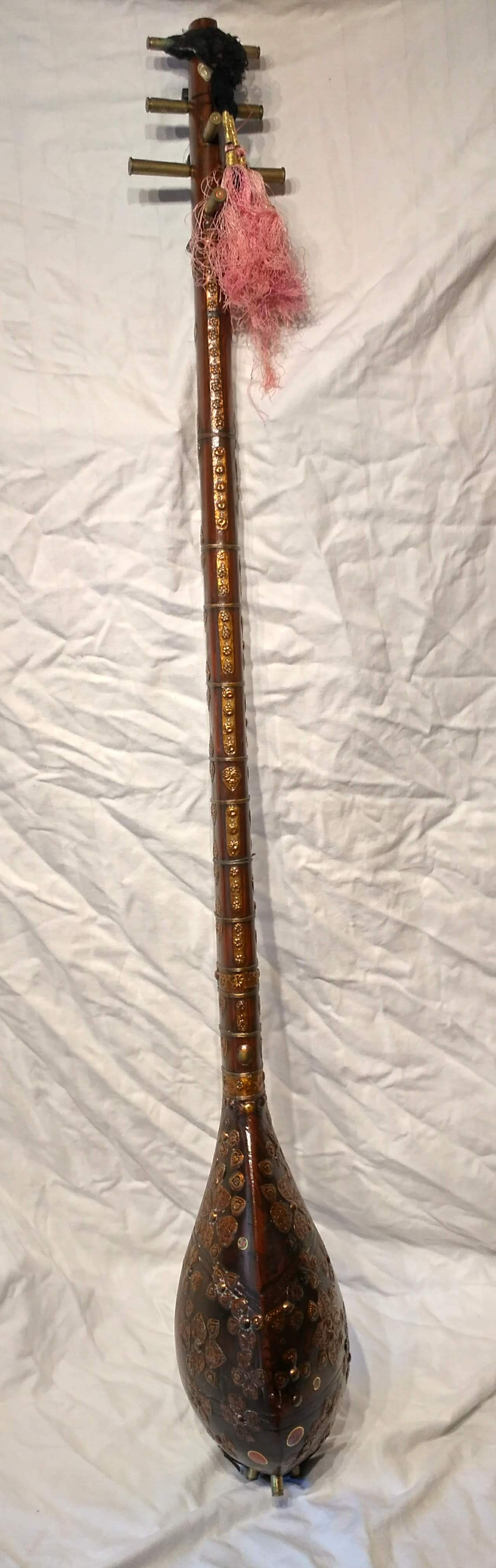
Chitrali sitar. Back view.

The chitrali sitar (Urdu: چترالی ستھار) is a long-necked lute played in northern area, Chitral of Pakistan. It is not related to the Indian sitar and its name is related to setar, the Central Asian and Iranian long-necked lute.

The instrument has five strings in three courses, the middle course being of one string. Melody is played on the top two strings which are fretted together.

The tuning of the instrument is unusual, as the single middle string does not go down the whole length of the neck of the instrument, instead it passes under the first four frets, where it then emerges and takes its place with the other strings. At this fret all the strings have the same note (g) - the actual tuning of the instrument is cc g cc. All the strings are of the same thickness, and are made of very thin metal wire, far thinner than the thinnest guitar string.

The two bottom c notes and the g note act as a drone and the melody is strummed on the top two strings. The scale is a special scale of only seven notes to an octave and the player moves their hand up and down the neck, often quite rapidly to play the instrument. The thinness of the neck makes it very easy to move the hand quickly up and down the neck to reach different notes.

The whole instrument is made of mulberry wood, the body being carved from a single block with a thin wooden table and a very low bridge about the height of a matchstick. The strings pass over this bridge and are often fixed to a metal eye at the bottom of the body. The mulberry wood neck of the instrument is fixed to the body and there is a mulberry nut at the top leading to five carved wooden winders for the strings.

The instrument is not very loud, and is played by strumming the top course of strings with the forefinger while allowing the finger to also play the drone strings. It is related very much to instruments from Central Asia and similar long necked lutes (although not with the strange middle string arrangement which seems to be a regional invention) can be found over the border in the neighbouring countries to the West and North.

== Playing ==
It is often played in tea rooms in Chitral district. It can be played to accompany singing, sometimes along with drums, or beating on the jeer can (empty petrol jerry can).

== See also ==
- Pashto music
- Photos at ur:چترالی ستھار

== Famous Artists ==
- Shah Gule Zar
- Ali Zuhur
- Habibur Rahman Lal
- Sultan Ghani
- Shaukat Ali
- Said Faqir
- Panah Shah
- Shamsud Din
- Basharat Basha

Tassaduq Ali Shah
