= Mahlagha Mallah =

Iranian environmental activist and librarian (1917–2021)

- مه‌لقا ملاح
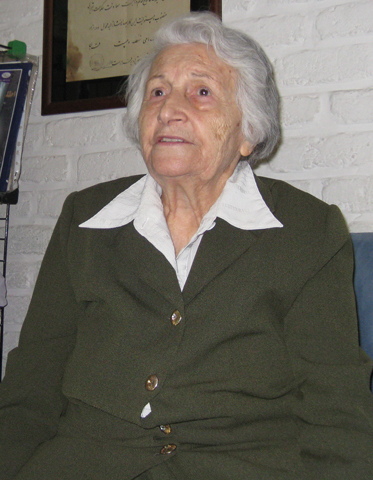
- Mallah in the "Women's Society for Combating Environmental Pollution" office in 2008
- Born: 21 September 1917; Now Kandeh, Golestan province, Qajar Persia
- Died: 8 November 2021 (aged 104); Tehran, Iran
- Education: University of Tehran; University of the Sorbonne
- Occupations: Librarian, environmental activist
- Employer: University of Tehran
- Organization: Women's Society Against Environmental Pollution
- Spouse: Hossein Abolhassani
- Children: 4
- Mother: Khadijeh Afzal Vaziri
- Relatives: Hossein Ali Mallah (brother); Bibi Khanoom Astarabadi (maternal grandmother), Ali-Naqi Vaziri (maternal uncle)

Mahlagha Mallah (Persian: مه‌لقا ملاح; 21 September 1917 – 8 November 2021) was an Iranian environmental activist and librarian, who founded the Women's Society Against Environmental Pollution. She was referred to as the "Mother of Iran's Environment".

== Early life ==
Mallah was born on 21 September 1917, in a caravanserai close to Now Kandeh, whilst her parents were travelling to Mashhad on a pilgrimage. Her mother Khadijeh Afzal Vaziri, and her grandmother Bibi Khanoom Astarabadi, were both women's rights activists in Iran. Her father, Aghabzorg Mallah, worked for the government and lived in several cities. At age 17, Mallah married Hossein Abolhasani.

== Education and career ==
After studying philosophy, social sciences and sociology at the University of Tehran, Mallah was awarded an MA in social sciences in 1958. In 1966, she moved to Paris to study for a PhD at the University of the Sorbonne, where she graduated in 1968. During her time in Paris, she also studied librarianship at the National Library of France.

After graduation, Mallah returned to Iran and began work as a librarian at the Psychology Research Institute Library at the University of Tehran. It was only after her retirement from librarianship that Mallah and her husband began their environmental campaigning.

== Activism ==
Mallah's interest in environmental activism was fostered growing up as her mother, Khadijeh Afzal Vaziri, was an environmentalist too. However her interest grew when she was working as a librarian and, in 1973, read a book on pollution in order to understand how to catalogue it.

After Mallah retired in 1977, she began work researching pollution in Tehran, and started by visiting houses and knocking on people's doors to talk to them about pollution and other environmental issues. She founded the organisation the Women's Society Against Environmental Pollution, which was the first non-governmental environmental organisation in Iran. It was founded in 1993 and registered with the Ministry of the Interior in 1995. As a campaigning organisation, by 2012 it had become the largest environmental group in Iran. It has branches in 14 Iranian cities and has enabled over 25,000 families to recycle. In 2011, it was reputedly the most popular environmental group in the country.

In 2009, the Society published a report entitled "Water Rights" and stressed the urgent need for the conservation of wetland habitats in Iran. This includes work in the Zayandeh Rud region.

== Awards ==
- Personality of the Year – "Natural Heritage and Environment" (2010)

== Legacy ==
As a result of her activism, Mallah became known as the "Mother of Iran's Environment". She has been described as an ecofeminist, since her outlook on environmental issues emphasises that women need to be central in any kind of environmentalism.

The 2015 documentary All My Trees, directed by Rakhshān Banietemad, featured Mallah's life story.

Mallah died on 8 November 2021, at the age of 104.
