= Setar =

Persian plucked musical instrument with three strings

Setar (سه‌تار)
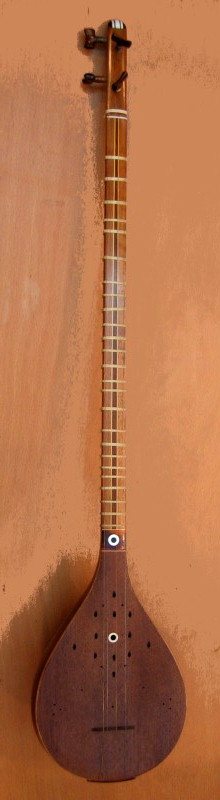
- A typical Iranian setar

String instrument
- Other names: setaar or setâr
- Classification: Plucked
- Hornbostel–Sachs classification: 321.321 (Necked-bowl lutes: instruments in which sound is produced by one or more vibrating strings, in which the resonator and string bearer are physically united and can not be separated without destroying the instrument, in which the strings run in a plane parallel to the sound table, whose body is shaped like a bowl)
- Developed: Developed by the 15th century, possibly earlier. 4th string added widely by 19th century

Playing range
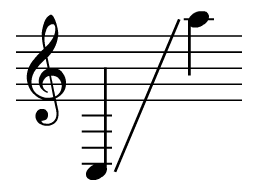

Related instruments
- Choghur; Tambouras; Tanbur; Tar

Sound sample
- A short clip in "Dastgahe Segah" using the Setar.

A setar (Persian: سه‌تار, pronounced [seˈt̪ʰɒːɾ], lit: "Three Strings") is a stringed instrument, a type of lute used in Persian traditional music, played solo or accompanying voice. It is a member of the tanbur family of long-necked lutes with a range of more than two and a half octaves. Originally a three stringed instrument, the addition of a fourth string is commonly credited to Sufi mystic and musician Moshtaq Ali Shah. It is played with the index finger of the right hand.

It has been speculated that the setar originated in Persia by the 9th century AD. A more conservative estimate says "it originated in the 15th century, or even earlier".

Although related to the tanbur, in recent centuries, the setar has evolved so that, musically, it more closely resembles the tar, both in tuning and playing style.

== Etymology ==
According to Curt Sachs, Persians chose to name their lutes around the word tar, meaning string, combined with a word for the number of strings. Du + tar is the 2-stringed dutār, se + tar is the 3-stringed setār, čartar (4 strings), pančtār (5 strings).

The modern Iranian instrument's name سه‌تار setâr is a combination of سه se—meaning "three"—and تار târ—meaning "string", therefore the word gives the meaning of "three-stringed" or "tri-stringed".

In spite of the instrument's name implying it should have three strings, the modern instrument actually has four strings. An additional string between the middle and top string was added around the 19th century. This addition is commonly credited to Sufi mystic and musician Moshtaq Ali Shah based on the attributions by traditional musical authorities such as Abolhasan Saba and Ruhollah Khaleqi. The Strings however are grouped so that musicians are still dealing with three groups or courses of strings, instead of four separately played strings.

== Sharing a name ==
Other tanbur-family instruments share the setar name. Sharing the name may not mean a direct connection between the musical traditions.

In Tajikistan, the Pamiri Setor is larger than the Iranian setar. It has 3 playing strings and sympathetic strings (as many as 8–12). It is played with a "thimblelike metal plectrum" worn on a finger.

In Baluchistan, the setar is larger than the Iranian setar, and is a "rhythmic drone" instrument to accompany singing. Its three strings are set up to resemble the dutar's two strings: one bass string and a pair of strings tune "a 4th higher."

In Pakistan, there exists the Chitrali sitar with 5 strings in 3 courses, with melody played on the top two strings.

In Xinjiang, China, Satar (Uyghur: ساتار; Chinese: 萨塔尔, Sàtǎ'ěr) (Note: The Chinese translation—萨塔尔, sàtǎ'ěr—is a transliteration of the original Persian loanword (via Uyghur).) is an important instrument in 12 muqam. It is a bowed lute with 13 strings, one raised bowing string and 12 sympathetic strings, tuned to the mode of the muqam or piece being played.

In India, the Sitar is an instrument with many forms. Its name is "an Urdu transcription of the Persian sihtār". The Indian instrument was likely adapted from instruments brought by Muslim empires and then developed locally.

== Construction ==
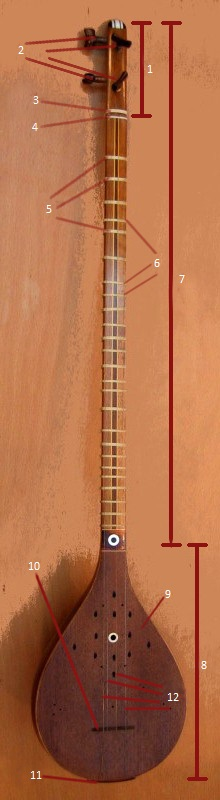
Parts of an Iranian Setar

1. Peghead or headstock 2. Pegs 3. Fret above nut 4. Nut 5. Main Frets 6. Side Frets or Secondary Frets 7. Neck 8. Bowl 9. Sound holes 10. Bridge 11. String holder or wire holder 12. Strings

The instrument can be categorized as a neck-bowl instrument. Strings run from the pegs at the top of the neck, across a bone or plastic nut that has grooves to separate them, down the neck, across the bowl, over the bridge and are secured to a string holder at the end of the bowl. The pegs are inserted directly into the end of the instrument's neck, similar to a headstock.

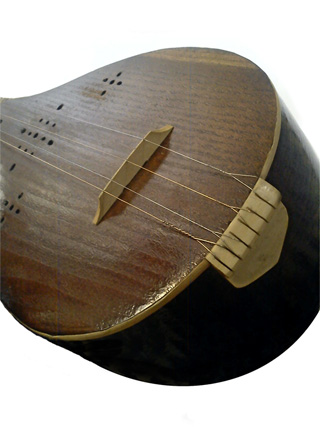
Setar bowl or body, string holder, strings, bridge and sound holes

The bowl is structurally similar to the bowl of the tanbur, but smaller and pear-shaped. The length of the bowl is from 26 to 30 cm, its width is between 12 and 16 cm and its depth is about 13 cm. It is usually made of mulberry or walnut wood. The structure of the bowl can be either a single piece of wood or made of separate and glued pieces. The soundboard of the bowl is made of thin sheets of wood. It has sound holes to let the sound escape the bowl. The musician's hand may be placed on it while playing.

The length of the neck is 40 to 48 cm long and 3 cm wide. A 12 cm section at the top is set aside for the pegs. The neck may be decorated with camel bone, covering the neck to make it more beautiful and to extend its useful life.

The wooden bridge is between 5 and 6 cm long and its height is less than 1 cm. It has shallow grooves for the strings to rest in. The strings, after passing over the bridge from the neck, are secured on the wire holder. The neck has frets made from thin threads made of animal intestines or silk. They are tied in 3 or 4 strands across the neck, and are responsible for dividing the neck into lengths, allowing the musician to find notes. There may be 26 frets, one of which is at the nut and not used to create a note.

== Characteristics ==
The setar belongs to the tanbur family, but today it is very close to the tar, having the same neck (and same number of frets and tuning system).

The setar has a pear-shaped body, made (like those of the lute or oud) from strips of thin mulberrywood lathes, glued together into a bowl. Alternatively, the bowl could be carved from a block of wood. The bowl is approximately 25 cm long and 15 centimeters at the widest point, and 15 centimeters deep.

The neck of the instrument is long and narrow, long enough to support a 62–70 cm-long string (minus the 25 cm where the string passes over the bowl after leaving the neck). The neck has gut strings wrapped around it which function as frets, which can be positioned to change the notes that the musician will hit upon fingering at the fret. The New Grove Dictionary of Musical Instruments says that there are between 25 and 27 frets. Another source, mentions between 22 and 28 frets, placed according to the musician's ear.

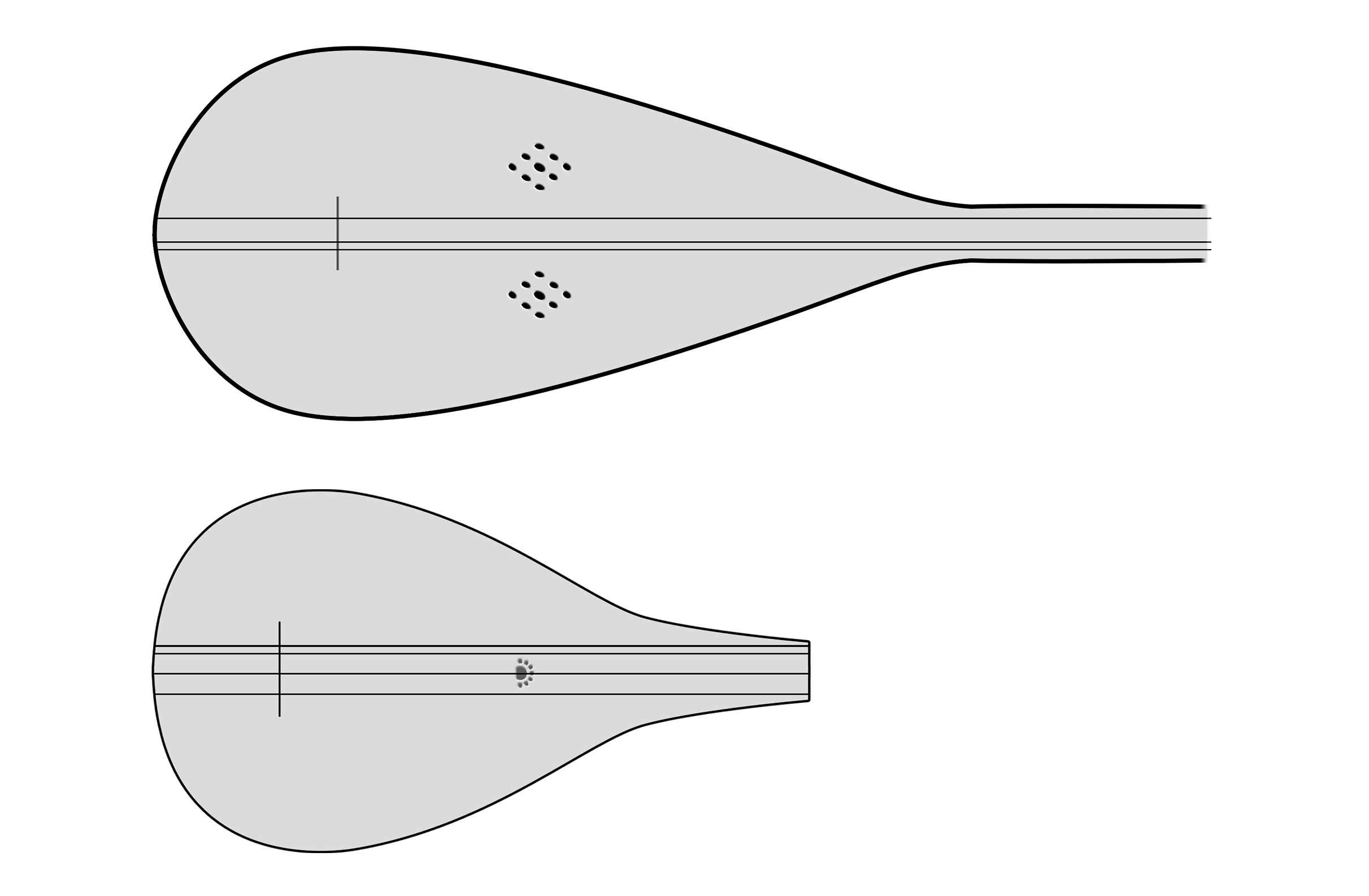
Comparison of the bowl of the tanbur (top) and setar (bottom)

The instrument is strung with four strings. From top to bottom the strings are (4) bam or bass string, (3) drone string, (2) yellow string, and (1) silver string.

The top-two strings, referred to together by the one-string's name —bam (بم)— function together as a pair and are played together. The other two strings are known as the gold string and the silver string. The silver string is the melody string. Historically, only the (4) bam string, the (2) yellow string and the (1) silver string existed. The need for the additional fourth string was recognized centuries ago, by intellectual thinkers such as Abu Nasr al-Farabi (ca. 872–950 AD), Abu Ali Sina (980–1037 AD), Safi al-Din Ermavi (ca. 1216–1294 C.E.), and (in the 20th century) the late Abul Hassan Khan Saba.

The new string is sometimes referred to as the "fourth string" because it is the last of the four strings to be added to the instrument. However, it was inserted between the yellow string and bass string; today when looking at the modern instrument being played, it is the (3) drone string, the third string from the bottom. The newest string is also known as the Moshtaq (مشتاق) string, because it is commonly attributed to Moshtaq Ali Shah, according to authors such as Abolhassan Saba and Ruhollah Khaleqi.

== Playing the setar ==
The setar is played with the musician sitting, held at a 45-degree angle on the right thigh. Normally, the musician uses the fingers of the left hand on the frets to choose notes on the white string, bottom-most string) The right hand plays the setar, usually using only the index finger.

The instrument is played using the index finger of the right hand, using an "oscillating motion" This differentiates it from the tanburs, which are plucked with multiple fingers or with a homemade plectrum, made from plastic, quills or razor blades.

In more complicated works the musician may use the index, middle, ring and sometimes the little finger of the left hand to fret notes, and may use the thumb to pick notes on the bass strings.

== Tuning the setar ==
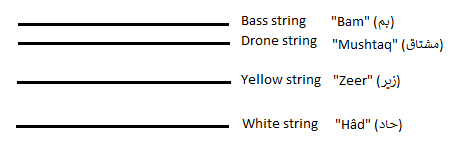
Position of setar strings by name. From top to bottom the strings are called bam (بم), mushtaq (مشتاق), zeer (زیر) and hâd (حاد).

The instrument is most commonly tuned c c' g c' using Helmholtz pitch notation.

The strings are tuned in multiple ways, to match a music's tonality or a singer's voice.

=== Example ===
A basic example showing one of the tuning patterns, listed in scientific pitch notation, top to bottom: C_{3} C_{4} • G_{3} • C_{4}. The lowest pitch strings played together as a course (C_{3} C_{4}) are the bass string (made of bronze or phosphor-bronze) and the drone (made of steel). The highest pitch strings are the "yellow" G_{3}, made of bronze or phosphor-bronze and the "white" C_{4} made of steel.

=== Movable frets ===
Players not only tune the strings of the setar, but also move the gut or nylon frets that are tied around the neck, between the neck and the strings. Since these frets are moveable, players can move them to set notes closer or farther apart. The instrument is designed to play microtones, pitches between the standard western pitches on the piano keyboard.

A Koron lowers and a Sori raises the pitches by quarter steps (flats and sharps are half-steps).

=== Setting strings for a Dastgâh ===
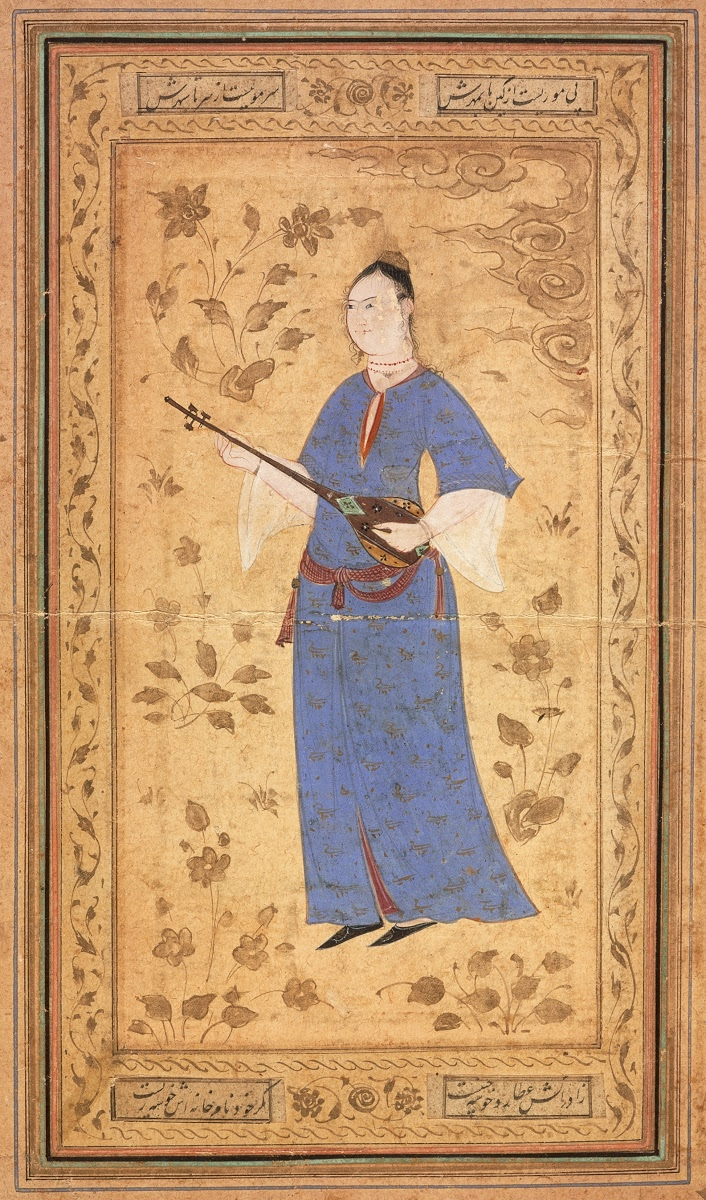
Woman with a Setar, Safavid Iran, Isfahan (ca. 1600–1610)

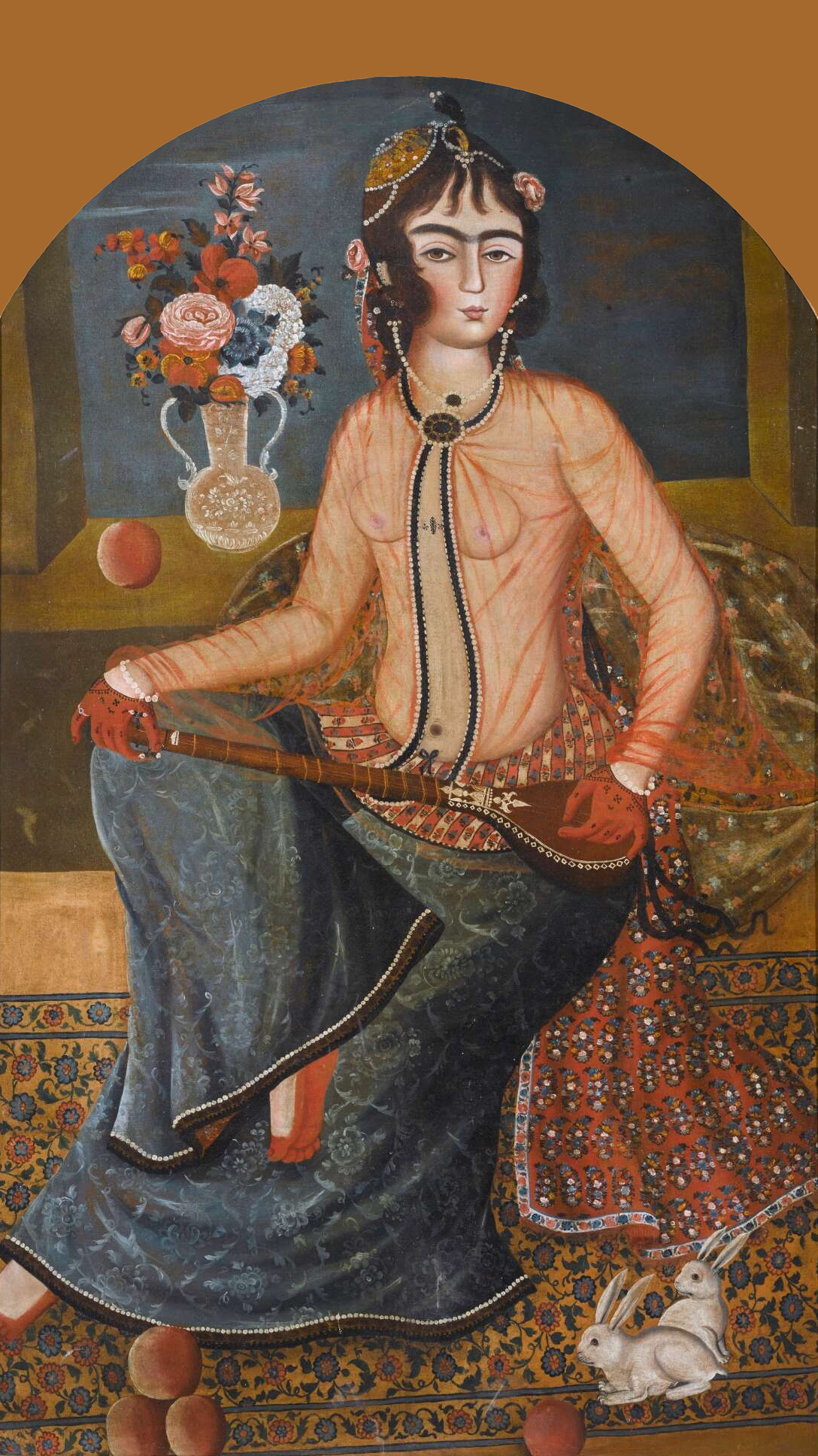
Woman with a Setar, Qajar Iran, Tehran

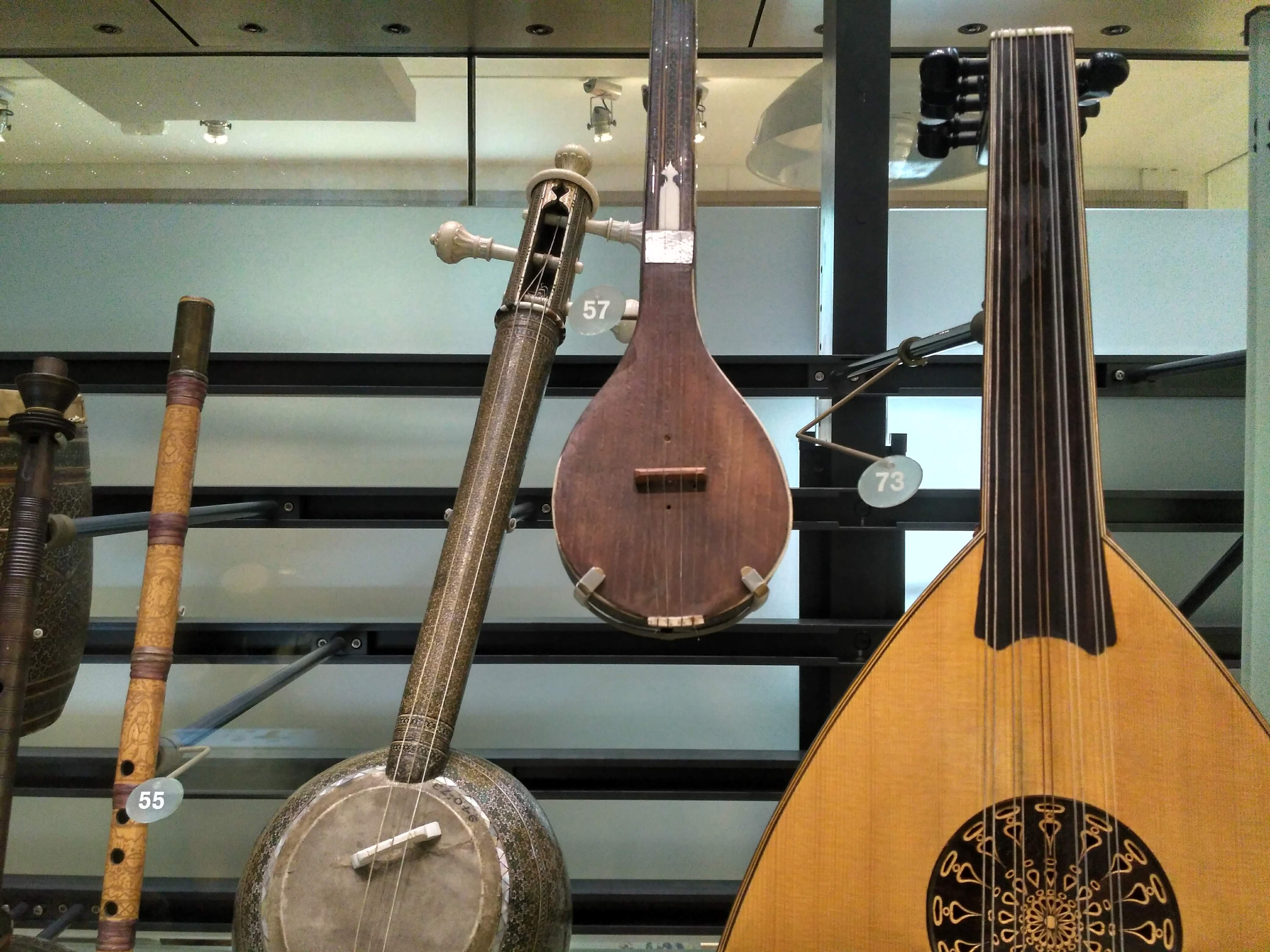
A very old Setar in Horniman Museum, London

Strings are tuned to meet the tonal requirements of Dastgâh.

The instrument's four strings are not always set the same. Tones are not absolutes (unless playing with instruments that are set, such as a western-instruments with standardized and unchangeable pitches). Rather, the strings are intervals, what one string sounds like when compared to the first string.

Mahur and Chahargah
String	Persian note	An equivalent western note	Sound clip of note
Bass string	C	A#	Mahoor and Chahargah tuning, 4th string, Persian tone C, Western tone = A sharp
Drone string	C	A#	Mahoor and Chahargah tuning, 3rd string, Persian tone C, Western tone = A sharp
Yellow string	G	F	Mahoor and Chahargah tuning, 2nd string, Persian tone G, Western tone = F
White string	C	A#	Tone used to tune to mahoor and chahargah dastgah

Nava and Homayun and Esfahan
String	Persian note	An equivalent western note	Sound clip of note
Bass string	D	C	Nava and Homayun and Esfahan tuning for Setar 4th string, Persian tone D = Western tone C
Drone string	D	C	Nava and Homayun and Esfahan tuning for Setar 3rd string, Persian tone D = Western tone C
Yellow string	G	F	Nava and Homayun and Esfahan tuning for Setar 2nd string, Persian tone G = Western tone F
White string	C	A#	Nava and Homayun and Esfahan tuning for Setar 1ststring, Persian tone C = Western tone A#

Rast Panjgah
String	Persian note	An equivalent western note	Sound clip of note
Bass string	C	A#	Rast Panjgah tuning for setar 4th string, Persian note C = Western note A sharp
Drone string	C	A#	Rast Panjgah tuning for setar 3rd string, Persian note C = Western note A sharp
Yellow string	F	D#	Rast Panjgah tuning for setar 2nd string, Persian note F = Western note D sharp
White string	C	A#	Rast Panjgah tuning for setar 1st string, Persian noteC = Western note A sharp

Shur and Afshari and Abu'ata and Dashti
String	Persian note	An equivalent western note	Sound clip of note
Bass string	F	D#	Shur, Afshari, Abu'ata and Dashti tuning for Setar, 4th string, Persian tone F = Western tone D sharp
Drone string	C	A#	Shur, Afshari, Abu'ata and Dashti tuning for Setar, 3rd string, Persian tone C = Western tone A sharp
Yellow string	G	F	Shur, Afshari, Abu'ata and Dashti tuning for Setar, 2nd string, Persian tone G = Western tone F
White string	C	A#	Shur, Afshari, Abu'ata and Dashti tuning for Setar, 1st string, Persian tone C = Western tone A sharp

=== Setting the frets ===
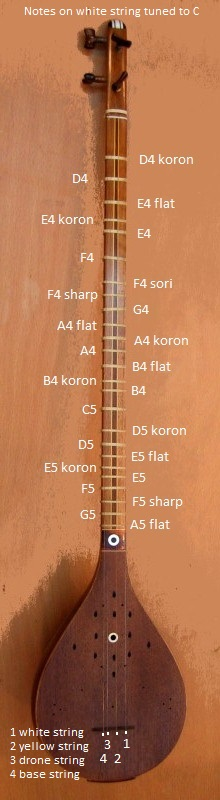
Notes for the white string of a on a 25-fret Setar. White string tuned to C.

The table below can be used to position the frets on the instrument's neck; the frets are made of tied string and are moveable. The instrument used to create the measurements had a scale length of 66 centimeters, from nut at the top to bridge at the bottom.

The table contains the names and playable samples of notes, for a string set to C.

The instrument has microtones; in western music the musical scale is made of tones and half-tones.

In Persian music, there can be quarter tones as well, marked koron or sori. These are quarter tones. Koron is 1/4 step flat. Sori is 1/4 step sharp.

For example, in the photo there is an E4, E4 flat, and between the two an E4 koron. Between the F4 and the F4 sharp is the F4 sori.

Fret number below nut	Name of note when open sting is C	Distance from nut (cm)	Distance from bridge (cm)	Number of wraps around neck	Sound clip of note
0 Open string	C4				Setar 1st string tuned to C, open string note
1	D4 koron	3.4	62.6	3	Setar 1st string tuned to C, 1st fret D koron
2	D	5.4	60.6	4	Setar 1st string tuned to C, 2nd fret D
3	E4 flat	7.3	58.7	4	Setar 1st string tuned to C, 3rd fret E flat
4	E4 koron	10.3	55.7	4	Setar 1st string tuned to C, 4th fret E koron
5	E4	12.1	53.9	3	Setar 1st string tuned to C, 5th fret E
6	F4	13.9	52.1	4	Setar 1st string tuned to C, 6th fret F
7	F4 sori	16.5	49.5	4	Setar 1st string tuned to C, 7th fret F sori
8	F4 sharp	19.0	47.0	3	Setar 1st string tuned to C, 8th fret F sharp
9	G4	20.6	45.4	3	Setar 1st string tuned to C, 9th fret G
10	A4 flat	22.0	44.0	4	Setar 1st string tuned to C, 10th fret A flat
11	A4 koron	24.2	41.8	3 or 4	Setar 1st string tuned to C, 11th fret A koron
12	A4	25.6	40.4	4	Setar 1st string tuned to C, 12th fret A
13	B4 flat	26.9	39.1	3	Setar 1st string tuned to C, 13th fret B flat
14	B4 koron	28.9	37.1	4	Setar 1st string tuned to C, 14th B koron
15	B4	30.1	35.9	3	Setar 1st string tuned to C, 15th fret B
16	C5	31.2	34.8	3	Setar 1st string tuned to C, 16th fret C
17	D5 koron	33.0	33.0	4	Setar 1st string tuned to C, 17th fret D koron
18	D5	35.7	30.3	3 or 4	Setar 1st string tuned to C, 18th fret D
19	E5 flat	36.7	29.3	4	Setar 1st string tuned to C, 19th fret E flat
20	E5 koron	38.2	27.8	4	Setar 1st string tuned to C, 20th fret E koron
21	E5	39.1	26.9	3	Setar 1st string tuned to C, 21st fret E
22	F5	39.9	26.1	3	Setar 1st string tuned to C, 22nd fret F
23	F5 sharp	41.3	24.8	4	Setar 1st string tuned to C, 23rd fret F sharp
24	G5	42.5	23.5	3	Setar 1st string tuned to C, 24th fret G
25	A5 flat	44.0	22.0	4	Setar 1st string tuned to C, 25th fret A flat

== The setar in recorded media ==
The setar was first recorded for the Gramophone Company in the winter of 1888-1889 (1306 AH) by Arthur James Twain. He recorded singer Batool Rezaei (stage name: Banoo Machol Parvaneh, mother of Khatereh Parvaneh) playing setar, accompanied by Habibollah Samaei on santur, Ghavam Al-Sultan on tar and Agha Mehdi Navai on ney.

Joey Walker of Australian psychedelic rock band King Gizzard and the Lizard Wizard played Setar in various songs, primarily on the 2016 album Nonagon Infinity.

== Notable setarists ==
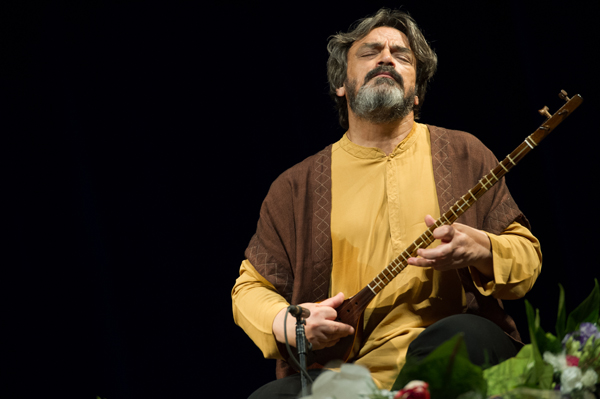
Hossein Alizadeh playing Setar

- Mirza Abdollah
- Hossein Alizadeh
- Ahmad Ebadi
- Sa'id Hormozi
- Kayhan Kalhor
- Mohammad-Reza Lotfi
- Hamid Motebassem
- Abolhasan Saba
- Dariush Safvat
- Keivan Saket
- Dariush Talai
- Jalal Zolfonun

== See also ==
- Music of Iran
- Barbat (lute)
- Bağlama
- Sitar
- Rubab
- Sataer
