= Music of Cyprus =

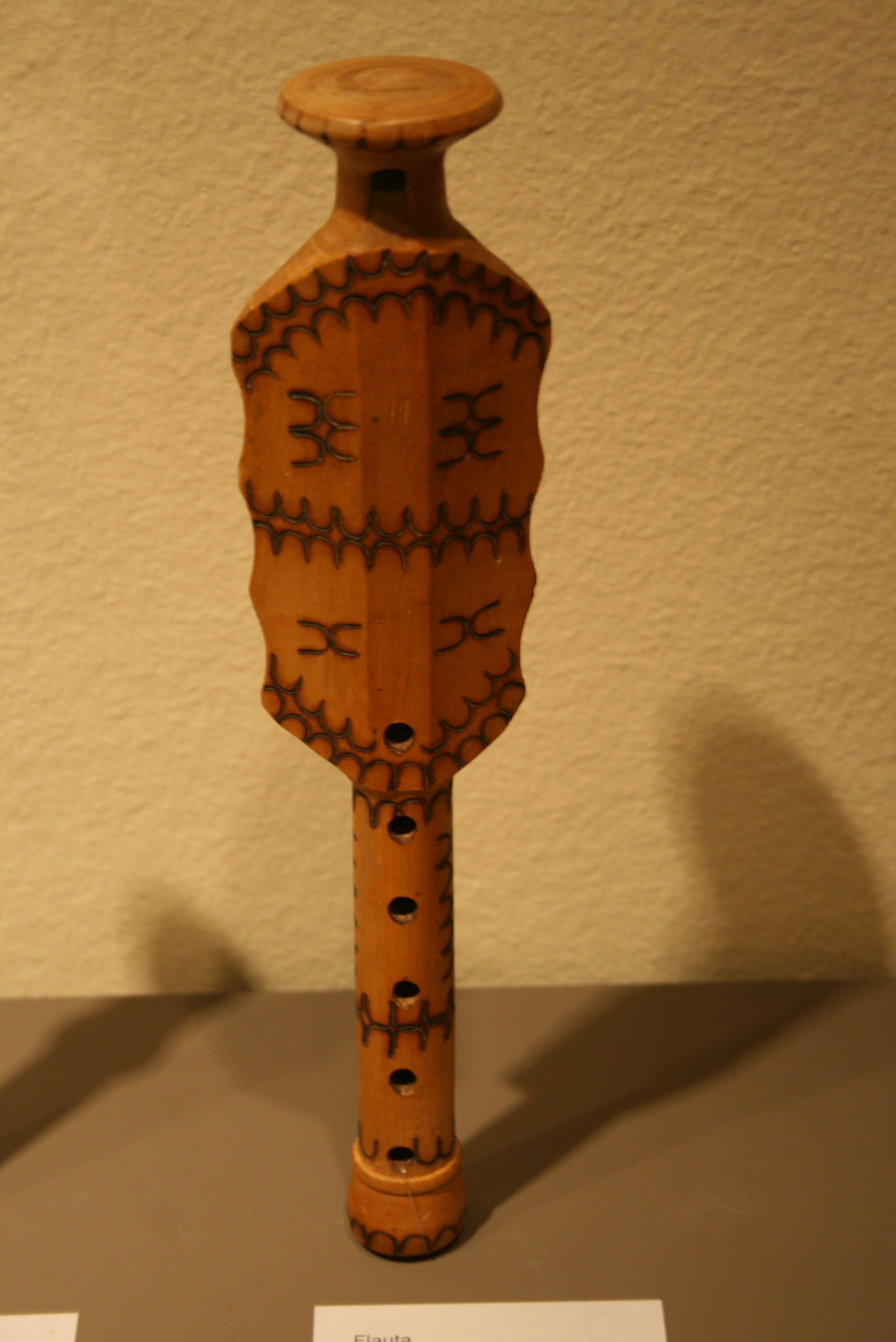
Flute from Cyprus

The music of Cyprus includes a variety of traditional, Western classical and Western popular genres. Cypriot traditional music is similar to the traditional music of Greece, it is most similar to Nisiotika the songs and dances of the Aegean islands, and includes dances like sousta, syrtos, ballos, tatsia, antikristos, arabiye, karotseris, sinalik, çifteli, zeimbekiko and the mandra dance.

== History ==
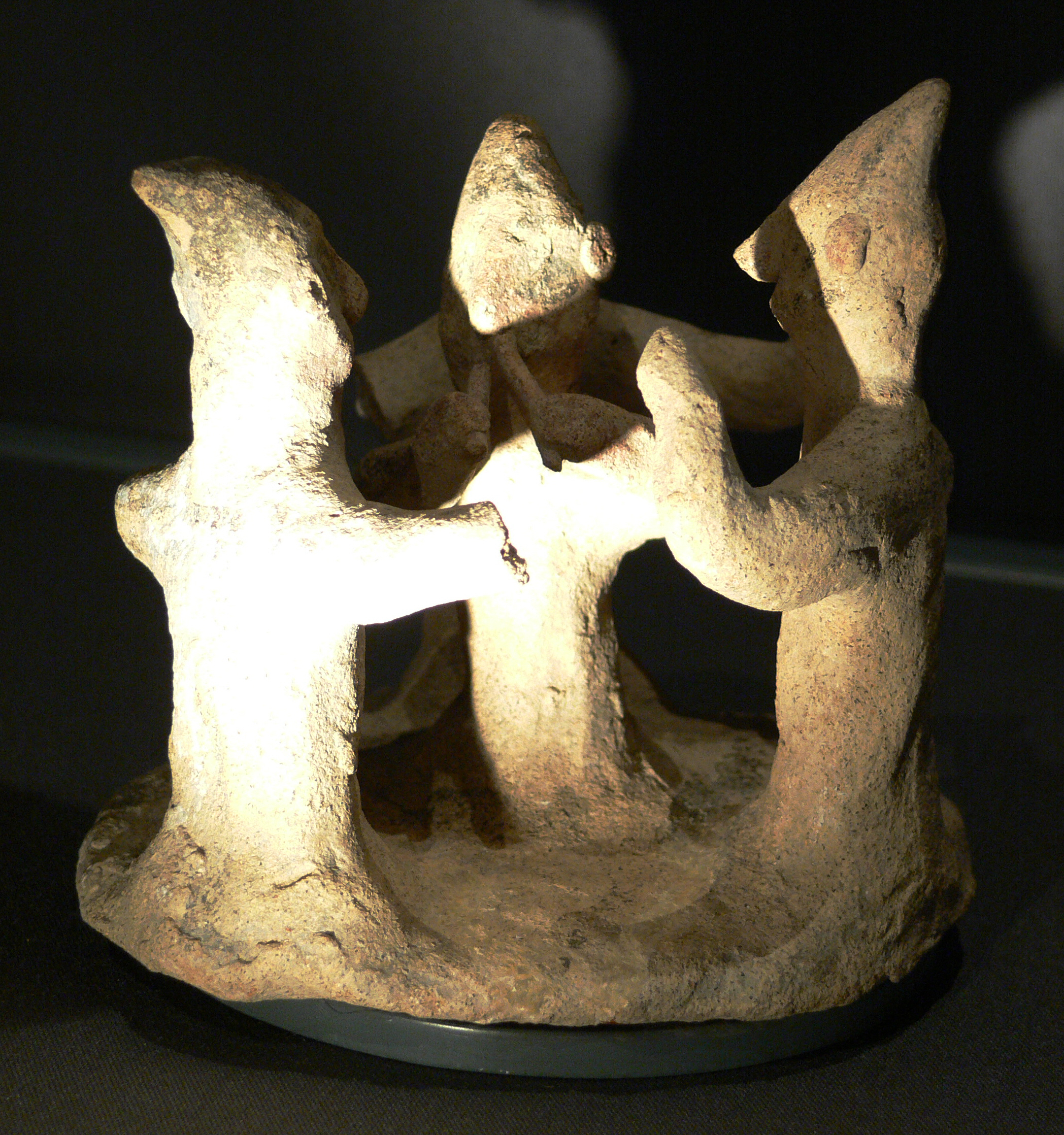
Cypriot terracotta figurine, 750–600 BC, depicting a double aulos player and two dancers. Kunsthistorisches Museum, Vienna.

=== Medieval music ===
Cyprus changed hands numerous times prior to the medieval era, and was an important outpost of Christianity and Western European civilization during the Crusades. The island's peak as a cultural capital of Europe occurred from 1359 to 1432. During that peak, Pierre I de Lusignan made a three-year tour on Europe, bringing with him an entourage of musicians that impressed Charles V in Rheims so much that he donated 80 francs in gold to them. On his return to Cyprus, Pierre I brought with him the French Ars Nova and, later, the Ars Subtilior. French musicians became well established in Cyprus, and the city of Nicosia became a capital of the Ars Subtilior style. Janus I de Lusignan saw Cypriot music evolve into its own variety of music. His daughter, Anne de Lusignan, brought a manuscript after her marriage to Louis, Count of Geneva, which contained 159 folios with over two hundred polyphonic compositions, both sacred and secular. The manuscript is now a part of the collection of the National Library of Turin.

=== Renaissance music ===
A key-figure of that era was Ieronimos o Tragodistis (Greek: Ιερώνυμος Τραγωδιστής, Hieronymus the Cantor), a Cypriot student of Gioseffo Zarlino, who flourished around 1550-1560 and, among others, proposed a system that enabled medieval Byzantine chant to correspond to the current contrapuntal practices via the cantus. One of his manuscripts is located in the library of Saint Ignatios Monastery in Lesbos.

=== Byzantine music ===
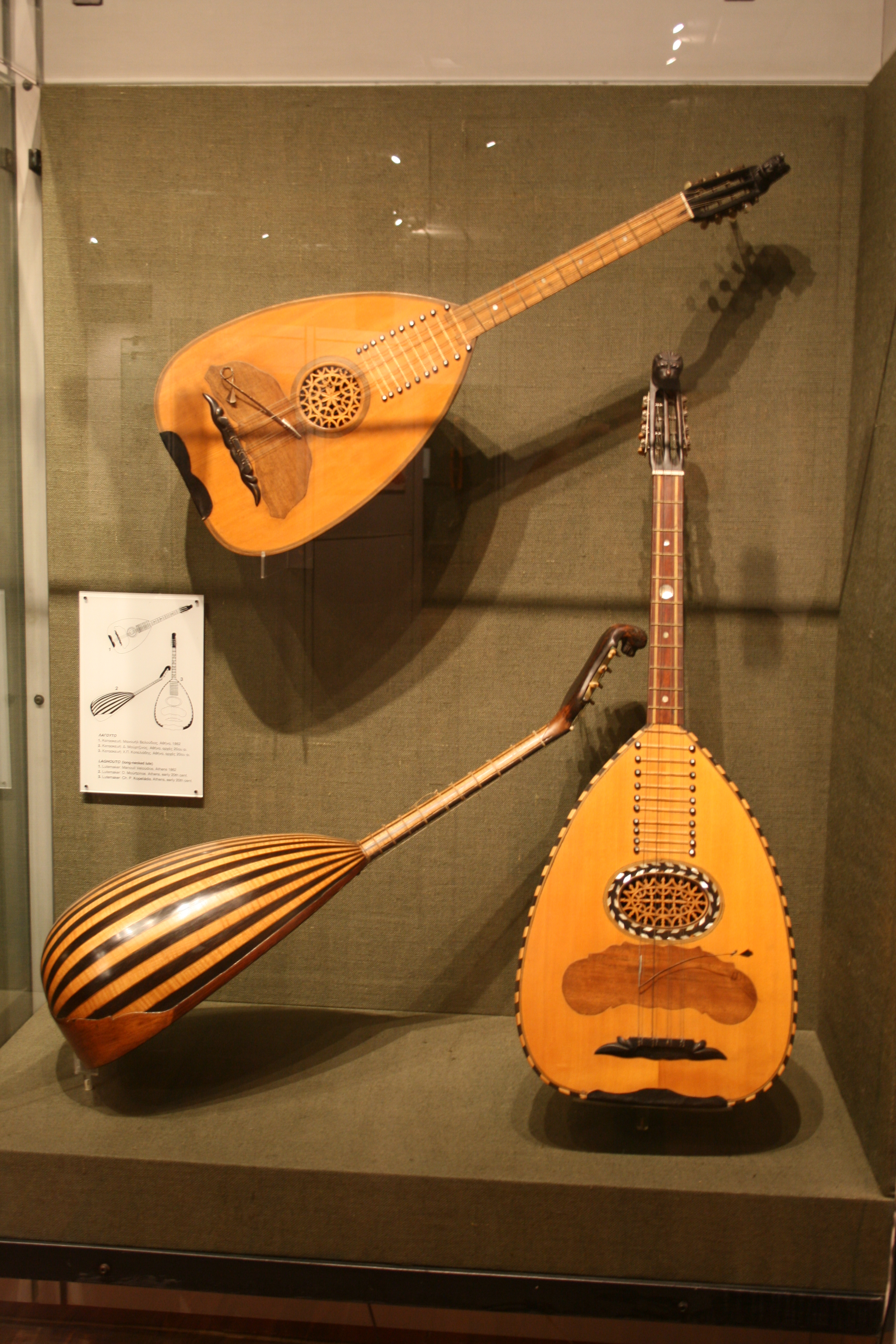
Different types of laouta, dominant instrument of the Cypriot traditional music.

The music of the island is influenced also by the Byzantine music. Athanasios Demetriadis, also known as Kasavetis, was a Cypriot deacon in Constantinople when Ecumenical Patriarch of Constantinople was his uncle Yerasimos (1794–1797). A secular song lamenting Death's preference for the young, written and set to music by him survives in a collection by Nikiforos Naftouniaris. Chrysanthos of Madytos, Gregory the Protopsaltes, and Chourmouzios the Archivist were responsible for a reform of the notation of Greek ecclesiastical music. Essentially, this work consisted of a simplification of the Byzantine musical symbols which, by the early 19th century, had become so complex and technical that only highly skilled chanters were able to interpret them correctly.

== Recent and current music scenes ==
=== Traditional music ===
Cypriot Greek traditional song: https://www.youtube.com/watch?v=DHRFRRjcLwU

Traditional music on Cyprus is similar to the traditional music of Greece and includes dances like the tatsia, sousta, syrtos, ballos, zeibekiko, karotseris, sinalik, chiftetteli, arabkyes, mandra dance and the karsilama suites. Note that unlike Greece and Turkey, there are suites of five karsilama dances, different for men and women some of them other than the standard 9/8 rhythm. The fifth karsilama dance is also known as ballos for both men's and women's suites. Traditional Cypriot music – similar to Greek and Turkish traditional music – is modal, based on the musical systems of the Byzantine echos / Turkish makam. Both Greek and Turkish Cypriots use the violin as the main solo instrument, accompanied by the lute. The tamboutsia and the pithkiavlin are also used. Until the beginning of the 20th century, the davul and the zurna (daouli and zournes in Greek) were used by both communities (although mostly by Turkish Cypriots) in village festivals and weddings, but these instruments were later excluded from the Greek Cypriot soundscape. Another instrument that was played earlier in Cyprus was tambouras, which is known in Greece as 'pandoura' or 'trichordo' (a three-stringed instrument). Notable performers of Greek Cypriot folk music include singers Theodoulos Kallinikos, Michalis Tterlikkas, Christos Sikkis, Michalis Hadjimichail and Ilias Kouloumis. The chiatistá (Cypriot Greek: τσιαττιστά, "spite [song]") is improvised antiphonal singing akin to the Cretan mantinada, to express a range of themes be it satire, love, mourning etc. Greek-Cypriot folk music is most closely related to the Nisiotika (the folk music of the Aegean Islands) and especially so to the music of the Dodecanese. The traditional music of Cyprus is also greatly influenced from the music of the Greeks of Asia Minor.

Attempts to either popularize or fuse traditional music with other genres have taken place since the 1970s. For example, the famous singer and composer, in Cyprus and Greece, of traditional Cypriot and popular music is Mihalis Violaris. Another example includes Monsieur Doumani, a Cypriot band from Nicosia which focuses on developing Cypriot traditional music and reworking traditional Cypriot folk songs.

=== Western classical music ===
The Republic of Cyprus has its own symphony orchestra, the Cyprus Symphony Orchestra, a professional, full-time symphonic orchestra which was established in 1987 (as the Cyprus Chamber Orchestra) along with the Cyprus Youth Symphony Orchestra and its music school which provides education and musical training to young musicians of all levels. These institutions are under the umbrella of the Cyprus Symphony Orchestra Foundation which is fully subsidised and supervised by the Ministry of Education and Culture.

Cypriot musicians and performers of classical music include the pianists Cyprien Katsaris and Martino Tirimo and the pianist and musicologist Solon Hadjisolomos.

Notable composers include:

- Nicolas Economou
- Marios Joannou Elia
- Yannis Kyriakides (born 1969), Cyprus-the Netherlands
- Solon Michaelides (1905–1979), Cyprus-Greece
- George Kallis Cyprus-USA
- Andreas G Orphanides
- Savvas Savva
- Andys Skordis

=== Western popular music ===
==== Rock and heavy metal music ====
===== First era: 1970s to 1990s =====
The history of Cyprus' rock and heavy metal music begins a few years after the war of 1974, during the late 1970s. This period is known as the First Rock Era of Cyprus. One of the pioneers of the rock/metal scene in Cyprus is Kim Nicolaou founder of the band known as Kimstyle TR (TR standing for Teenage Revolution). This band was the first to bring and introduce live rock shows to the Island. The band's first pop/rock single was called "The Lady & The Parrot" which was so ahead of its time, for the standards of Greece and Cyprus, that the lyrics were found offensive; therefore, it was banned by CyBC TV and copies of the single were burnt by the customs authorities. This spawned many teenagers to start forming bands & that brought competitions amongst them in the movie theatres. Kimstyle and Kim Nicolaou's Rock & Reggae show (first of its kind broadcast by CyBC), who later influenced the group Armageddon in the mid-1980s, with their traditional heavy metal sound are considered to have taken rock music on the Island one step further. The longest-running band to date, they have managed to be synonymous to the Cyprus metal scene throughout the years, with quality releases and a few visits abroad. Nowadays, they have moved more into the progressive side of metal.

In the early 1990s, Godblood started the local Black metal scene, acting firstly as a school-band, and later on continuing with their small record label 'Throne Productions'. They have disbanded and only some can recall some shows they had in Cyprus with bands from the Greek scene like Rotting Christ and an international festival in Israel in the late 1990s. In Heavy/Power metal there were bands of great quality such as Diphtheria and later Arryan Path leading the genre.

There were also a couple of active Thrash metal bands during that era giving great live shows such as Regicide (supporting Epidemic) and then Scotoma. Eventually, the 1990s were a very active period for the scene in general.

===== After 2000 =====
Some popular rock bands in Cyprus were Akoustikoi Epivates (founded by lead singer Vyronas Potsos), lopodytes, savvas isovitis(solo singer/guitar), by accident, Katadotes (Καταδότες), Full Volume, Quadraphonic, Johnny & the Liars (Punk/Alternative rock), Maenads, Forty Plus, Triple Jam and Krokes (both are Greek rock bands), Ophiochus (Instrumental Funk/Rock), Isaac's Cello (Psychedelic/experimental).

Active bands, with releases and/or live shows of the 2000s (some appeared also in magazines and websites around the globe):

- Arkhon
- BLACK ANIS
- Blynd
- Methysos
- Quadrophonic
- Sonik Death Monkey
- Stormcast
- Winter's Verge

During this decade, there was an uprising of concerts of different sizes and musical directions across the island. This led to number of greek metal bands like Rotting Christ, SepticFlesh, Crossover, Nightfall, Ravencult, and W.E.B., as well as international acts like Anathema and Sepultura visiting and performing in Cyprus.

==== World musics ====
One of the most successful and recognised world music groups in Cyprus is Monsieur Doumani. The group was formed in Nicosia in 2012 and has released two albums, Grippy Grappa (2013) and Sikoses (2015). The band focuses upon the unique character of Cypriot folkloric music, enriching traditional songs with new arrangements, melodies, rhythms and sounds and crafting a style distinctively their own. The band's music is a blend of the traditional element with modern genres. Their repertoire also includes their own compositions in the Cypriot Greek dialect, which are inspired by contemporary Cypriot society, as for example the recent financial crisis that hit the island and the corrupted political system. Monsieur Doumani was nominated for "Best Newcomer" in Songlines Music Awards 2014 and participated in acclaimed festivals around the globe such as WOMAD Charlton Park 2014, Sommarscen Malmö, Songlines Encounters Festival etc.

==== Electronic/world music ====
In 2008 the electronic/world music group Mikros Kosmos ("small world") arrived in Cyprus and recorded their first album in Nicosia. Their first performances presented live remixes for laptop and voice of classic Greek rebetika, with performances at New York City's Golden Festival and elsewhere in the United States. Mikros Kosmos's full-length original album moves away from the classic rebetika with an affection for minimal arrangements and a lyrical abstraction which is uncommon in the history of Greek music.

=== Festivals ===
- Kypria Festival
- Pafos Aphrodite Festival (an international opera festival in Pafos)
- International Music Festival at the Kourion Amphitheatre.
- During the spring months of April and May Bellapais Abbey (a 13th Century Lusignan Monastery in Kyrenia) hosts celebrated musicians from all over the world.
- Salamis in Famagusta is another such Cyprus historic site used for concerts.
- Reggae Sunjam festival with local and international artists (taking place once a year during the summer)..

== See also ==
- Culture of Cyprus
- Music of Greece
- Greek culture
- Ars Subtilior
- Music history of France
- Music history of Italy
- Middle Eastern music
- Music of Europe
- Nicosia Music Society
