= Skordi =

Skordi (Greek: Σκορδή) is a Greek surname. Notable people with the surname include:

- Anthony Skordi, British-American actor.
- Marina Skordi (born 1962), Greek sprinter

== See also ==
- Andys Skordis
