= Christos Apostolides =

Cypriot teacher

Christos Apostolides (Greek: Χρίστος Αποστολίδης) (Limassol, 1870 - Limassol, 1932) was a Cypriot educator and schoolteacher. Apostolides was one of the first researchers to publish Cypriot folk songs using the European music scale.

== Early life and education ==
Apostolides was born in Limassol in 1870. He finished an 8 year elementary school (οκτατάξεο αλληλοδιδακτικό σχολείο) at the Katholiki neighbourhood, and a 5 year Greek high school (πεντατάξεα Eλληνική Σχολή Λεμεσού).

== Career ==
After graduating in 1888 he started working as a school teacher for four years in the villages Arsos and Asgata. He then taught at the First Primary School of Limassol (Α' Αστική Σχολή Λεμεσού). In 1912 he was constipted as a volunteer in the Balkan Wars, during his military training he fell ill and he was forced to return to his teaching position in Limassol. In 1923 the School Board suggested to him the position of the headmaster for the newly opened Third Primary School of Limassol (Γ' Αστική Σχολή Λεμεσού), which he accepted. He studied European and Byzantine music which he taught at various schools in Limassol, he also taught the violin. He was a cantor at the Agia Triada church.

He was honored in Athens and Paris for his contributions to Cypriot folk music. Apostolides was the first to teach folk dances in Limassol accompanied by song. He wrote Mathematics books for all grades of the Primary School, which were used by all Cypriot schools.

His most important work was published in 1910, there is another publication in Leipzig in 1911, it contained 21 folksong transcriptions harmonized for the piano by the Greek composer Dionysios Lavrangas that belonged to the Ionian school.

== Publications ==
- Αποστολίδης, X. (1903). Ο πρώτος. Γυναικείος κυπρικακός καρσιλαμάς, Μουσικὸν παράρτημα τῆς μουσικῆς ἐφημερίδος «Φόρμιγξ», 12 τεύχη έτ. Β ́, (Αθήνα), 97-105.
- Αποστολίδης, X. (1903). Παραλιμνίτισσα, Μουσικὸν παράρτημα τῆς μουσικῆς ἐφημερίδος «Φόρμιγξ», 12 τεύχη έτ. Β ́, (Αθήνα), 106-108.
- Αποστολίδης, X. (1903). Εις το γέμισμα του κρεββατιού και τον στολισμόν των μελλονύμφων, Μουσικὸν παράρτημα τῆς μουσικῆς ἐφημερίδος «Φόρμιγξ», 12 τεύχη έτ. Β ́, (Αθήνα), 108-110.
- Αποστολίδης, X. (1903). Η Καρπασίτισσα, Μουσικὸν παράρτημα τῆς μουσικῆς ἐφημερίδος «Φόρμιγξ», 12 τεύχη έτ. Β ́, (Αθήνα), 110-112.
- Αποστολίδης, X. (15-31 Δεκεμβρίου 1906). Κάλανδα Φώτων ως άδονται εν Λεμεσώ Κύπρου, Φόρμιγξ, περ. Β ́, έτ. Β ́, αρ. 17-18, (Αθήνα), 7.
- Αποστολίδης, X. (15-31 Δεκεμβρίου 1907). Κάλανδα της πρώτης του έτους ως άδονται εν Λεμεσώ της Κύπρου. Φόρμιγξ, περ. Β ́, έτ. Γ ́, αρ. 16-17-18, (Αθήνα), 10.
- Αποστολίδης, X. (15-31 Μαρτίου 1909) Περί του κυπριακού καρσιλαμά, Φόρμιγξ, περ. Β ́, έτ. Δ ́, αρ. 23-24, (Αθήνα), 4-5.
- Αποστολίδης, Χ. (1910). Ἂσματα καὶ χοροὶ κυπριακοὶ: 21 τεμάχια δι’ άσμα καὶ κλειδοκύμβαλον / Cyprus songs & dances: 21 pieces for singing and piano. Ἐν Λεμεσώ.
- Αποστολίδης, Χ. & Λαυράγκας Δ. (παρτιτούρα) (Ιούνιος 1912). H Παφίτισσα. Δημώδες Ελληνικόν Άσμα της Κύπρου. Μουσική: Εικονογραφημένον Μουσικοφιλολογικόν Περιοδικόν: μετά Τεμαχίων Φωνητικής και Οργανικής Μουσικής, Έτος Α', αρ. 6, 179-180.
- Αποστολίδης, Χ. (1922). Πρακτικη ἀριθμητικη. Προς χρησιν των μαθητων της τριτης (τεταρτης-πεμπτης και ἑκτης) ταξεως των δημοτικων οχολειων. Ἐν Λεμεσώ.

== Publications about Apostolides ==
- (1912). Ἂσματα καὶ χοροὶ κυπριακοὶ δι’ άσμα καὶ κλειδοκύμβαλον ὑπὸ Χρ. Ἀποστολίδου. Μουσική: Εικονογραφημένον Μουσικοφιλολογικόν Περιοδικόν: μετά Τεμαχίων Φωνητικής και Οργανικής Μουσικής, Έτος Α', αρ. 6, 168.
- Π. Σ. (Οκτώβριος 1921). Μουσική κίνησις εξωτερικού. Ανταπόκρισις εκ Κύπρου. Μουσικός Σύλλογος "Τέρπανδρος", Πετρόπουλος. Κύπριοι καλλιτέχναι. Διανέλλος, Ρωσσίδης, Χουρμούζιος, Πετρόπουλος, Αποστολίδης. Μουσική Επιθεώρησις. Μηνιαίον Εικονογραφημένον Καλλιτεχνικόν Περιοδικόν, Έτος Α' - Αριθ. 1, 10.
- Γιωργούδης, Πανίκος (1986). Η πρώτη συλλογή κυπριακών δημοτικών τραγουδιών και δημοτικής μουσικής. Μελέτη και παρουσίασή της. Η σημασία της. Μουσικολογία, 1, 43-50.
- Λαμπρογιάννης, Π. and Φευγάλας, Σ. (2020) Ζητήματα εναρμόνισης της δημοτικής μουσικής. Η περίπτωση του Διονύσιου Λαυράγκα μέσα από τη συλλογή κυπριακών τραγουδιών και σκοπών του Χρίστου Αποστολίδη. In: Φούλιας, Ι. Βούβαρης, Π., Καρδάμης, Κ. & Σακαλλιέρος, Γ. (eds.) 11ο Διατμηματικό Μουσικολογικό Συνέδριο: «Νεωτερισμός και Παράδοση» (με αφορμή τα 70 χρόνια από το θάνατο του Νίκου Σκαλκώτα) (Πρακτικά διατμηματικού συνεδρίου υπό την αιγίδα της Ελληνικής Μουσικολογικής Εταιρείας, Αθήνα, 21-23 Νοεμβρίου 2019), Ελληνική Μουσικολογική Εταιρεία, Θεσσαλονίκη.

== See also ==
- Theodoulos Kallinikos
- Music of Cyprus
