= Grippy (disambiguation) =

Grippy is a term used in The Colbert Show.

Grippy may also refer to:

- "Grippy" (song), by Cash Cobain and J. Cole
- Grippy socks, socks with a non-slip sole
- Grippy Toad, a fictional character
- Grippy Grappa, 2013 album by Monsieur Doumani
- The Laird o' Grippy, 1954 play by Robert Kemp
