= Theodoulos Kallinikos =

Cypriot musicologist, and archon protopsaltes (1904 – 2004)

Theodoulos Kallinikos (Greek: Θεόδουλος Καλλίνικος) (Leukoniko, 5 May 1904 – 9 May 2004) was an archon protopsaltes (cantor) of the Church of Cyprus and a musicologist of Cypriot folk music.

== Early life and education ==
Kallinikos was born on 5 May 1904 in Leukoniko, he graduated from the primary school of his village and attended a theological seminary. In 1919, at the age of 17, he went to Nicosia and studied under the eminent music teacher and protopsaltes Stylianos Hourmouzios, and attended Byzantine music classes until 1924. Later, in 1933-1934 he went to Athens, where he studied at the National Conservatory of Athens, learning Byzantine and European music, under Manolis Kalomiris, Ioannis Sakellaridis, Dionysios Lavrangas and Spyros Kapsaskis.

== Career ==
In 1924 he founded a School of Byzantine Music. In 1925 he was appointed as a psaltes in Prastio. In 1929 he was appointed psaltes of the Archbishop Cyrill III. From 1934 until 1977 he was hieropsaltes at the cathedral of Saint John, and from 1977 until his death he was archon protopsaltes of the Church of Cyprus.

In 1958, he suggested to Konstantinos Spyridakis, Headmaster of the Pancyprian Gymnasium, to teach the students twice a week of folk dances and songs, thus contributing to the establishment of the teaching of traditional Cypriot Music in Secondary Education. Later, for three years he taught folk dances at the Pedagogical Academy of Cyprus without pay.

At the Cyprus Broadcasting Corporation, Theodoulos Kallinikos together with his musical group, which consisted of a male vocal ensemble, violin, lute and pithkiali (shepherd's flute), made a series of recordings under the title: "Cypriot dances and songs".

From 1924 until 1948 he travelled throughout Cyprus recording folk songs. He worked on the material for three years and in 1951 he published it under the title Cypriot Folk Muse (Κυπριακή Λαική Μούσα), that records 83 Cypriot folk songs in Byzantine and European notation; as well as one song from Crete taken from A. Sigalas Collection of National Songs (Athens, 1880) and given for comparison. The book was the outcome of many years of traveling throughout the island. Most of the songs are modal, with the majority being Aeolian and the rest Dorian, Lydian and Hypophrygian.

== Personal life ==
He was married with Maroulla. They had one daughter, called Margarita, who worked for the Cyprus Broadcasting Corporation and was a member of EOKA.

== Legacy ==
Kallinikos is considered one of the most eminent voices of Byzantine music in Cyprus. His contribution to the recording and preservation of Cypriot folk music has been considered as immense. With his characteristic way of singing, Kallinikos established a style that is characteristic for Cyprus, both in traditional songs and in Byzantine hymns. He was an avid writer: he published 21 books on Byzantine music and some works on Cypriot folk music. He gave talks in many conferences. For his contribution, the Holy Synod of the Church of Cyprus awarded him the highest honorary office: "Archon Cantor of the Church of Cyprus", in 1977. In 2005, one year after his death, the Municipality of Lefkoniko and his family organised a philological symposium in his memory. In 2018 the Ministry of Education a student competition in his memory. In 18 October 2019 the Municipality of Nicosia organised a Byzantine and folk music concert in his memory. In 2014 he was commemorated by a stamp from the Cyprus post.

== Honours ==
- Commendation of the Academy of Athens (1978)
- Golden Cross of the Ecumenical Patriarchate (1986)
- Excellence in Letters and Arts of the Republic of Cyprus (1993)

== Publications ==
- Καλλίνικος, Θ. (1948). Εθνική ψαλμωδία. Εν Λευκωσία.
- Καλλίνικος, Θ. (1951). Κυπριακή Λαική Μούσα. Λευκωσία: Εταιρεία Κυπριακών Σπουδών.
- Καλλίνικος, Θ. (1981). Μέγα Θεωρητικό.

== See also ==
- Christos Apostolides
- Music of Cyprus
