= Saro Tribastone =

Italian musician (born 1966)

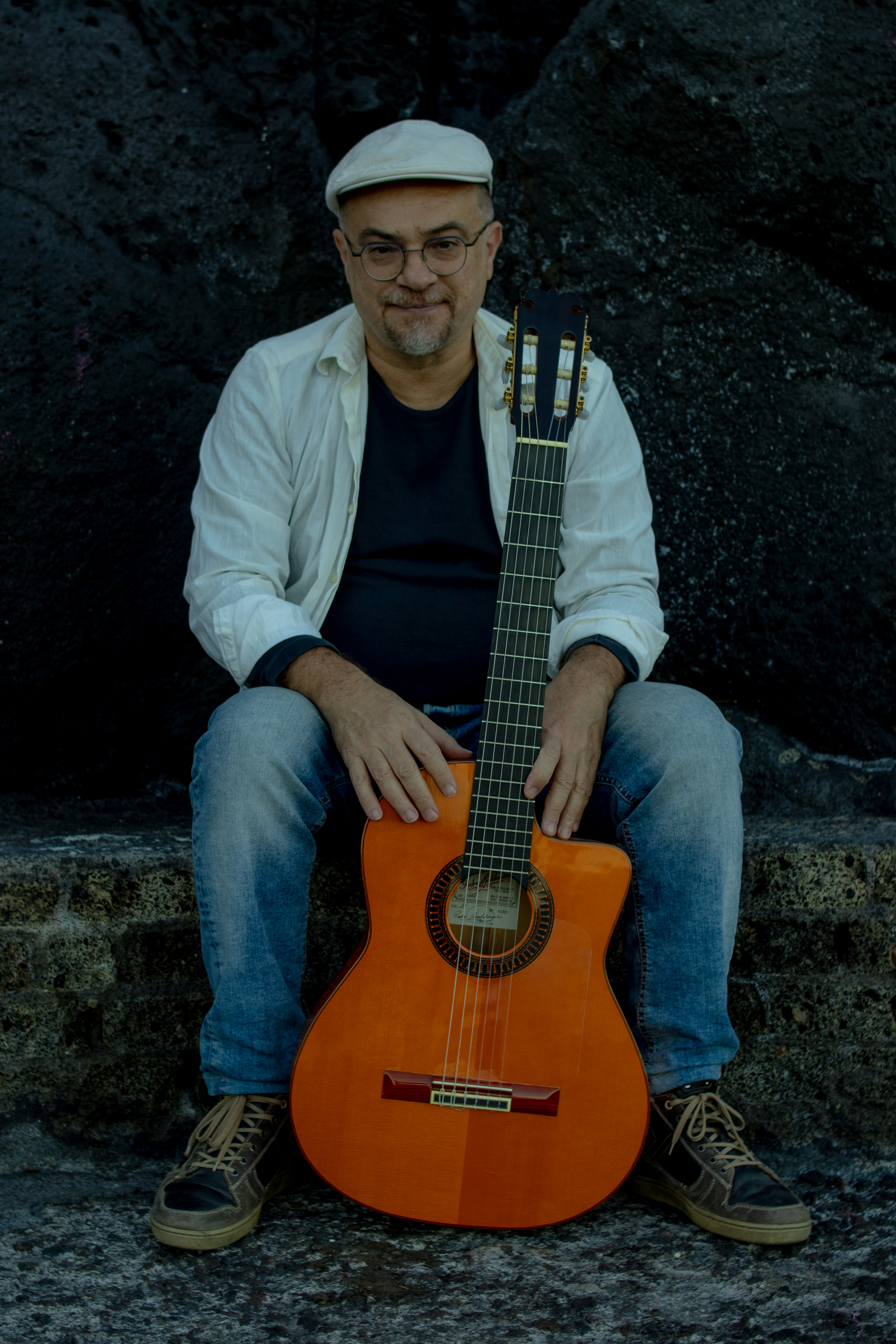

Background information
- Born: 27 November 1966 (age 59); Ragusa, Italy
- Origin: Sicily, Italy
- Genres: Mediterranean Instrumental, Nuevo Flamenco, Folk, World, Sicilian
- Occupations: Musician, Guitarist, Composer, Art Director
- Instruments: Flamenco guitar, Mandolin, Acoustic guitar, Tzouras, Chitarra battente
- Years active: 2006–present
- Labels: Saro Tribastone, Record Union, ZYX Music
- Website: sarotribastone.com

Saro Tribastone (born 27 November 1966 in Ragusa) is an Italian composer, guitarist and performer of Mediterranean instrumental music who expresses his love for his homeland in Sicily through his compositions and performances of acoustic music.

== Career ==
He is adept at playing a number of different string instruments like Italian Guitar, Flamenco Guitar, the Greek Tzouras, Chitarra Battente, Mandolin and Acoustic Guitar, to create his unique sound. His compositions express sounds of music made of popular Sicilian, Spanish flamenco and Latin rhythms and also echoes ethnic Greek, Arabian and Indian sounds. His style resembles the nuevo flamenco and world music. His passion for music began at age 6, when he was given his first acoustic guitar. Since then, he has been continuously perfecting his technique of Flamenco from various lands. At age 8, he started making his first short instrumental compositions. In his musical career, he has also composed soundtracks for several documentaries and television. Some of his songs have been used as accompanying music for programs broadcast on satellite TV in the USA over the years. Some choice tracks have been placed in satellite TV programs for the BBC, RAI, Discovery Channel, MTV and The Oprah Winfrey Show. His music also has been featured on The Landscape Channel.

In 2006, his first EP titled Fanusa was released, which contains the songs "Fanusa", a flamenco-derived South American track, "Serenade", inspired from Celtic music, and "Danza de la Luna Nueva", which mixes tango, flamenco and Greek music. Two of his songs, "Eve" and "Bongo Beach", produced together with the English duo Coyote were selected for the Laissez Faire Lounge 2 compilation, produced by ZYX Music as well as many other compilation albums. His latest album is Viento De Siroco, which is full of Mediterranean melodies. Many of his songs are named after places in Italy as a tribute to his homeland. His song "Libertad" features the Middle Eastern drum darabukka accompanying the guitar.

To date Saro has two albums and three singles to his credit: Babel Blue (2017), Remèny (2017) and Salinas (2012) as singles; the full length instrumental world collection titled Viento De Siroco (2009) and the EP Fanusa (2006).

In addition, he often performs live together in groups with Sicilian folk musicians. Associated acts include Cordasicula, a Sicilian duo since 2012, which offers original music inspired by the traditional sounds of the Mediterranean, especially in Sicily and southern Italy, wherein vocals and frame drums by Marilena Fede, are intertwined with the melodies played by Saro Tribastone on tzouras, mandolin and swing guitar. Tribastone also performs with the folk music band Faciti Rota from southern Italy. Saro also joined a group called Robasicula in 2007 and has been playing traditional and original popular music from Sicily with them, and currently performs live frequently. He also has art directed some folk music festivals and concerts in Sicily, like Ibla Folk, Abballati Abballati and Il Cuore In Una Barca Di Carta (The Heart In A Paper Boat).

== Discography ==
- Mirage (2019) - single
- Babel Blue (2017) - single
- Remèny (2017) - single
- Salinas (2012) - single
- Viento De Siroco (2009) - album
- Fanusa (2006) - EP

== Photo gallery ==
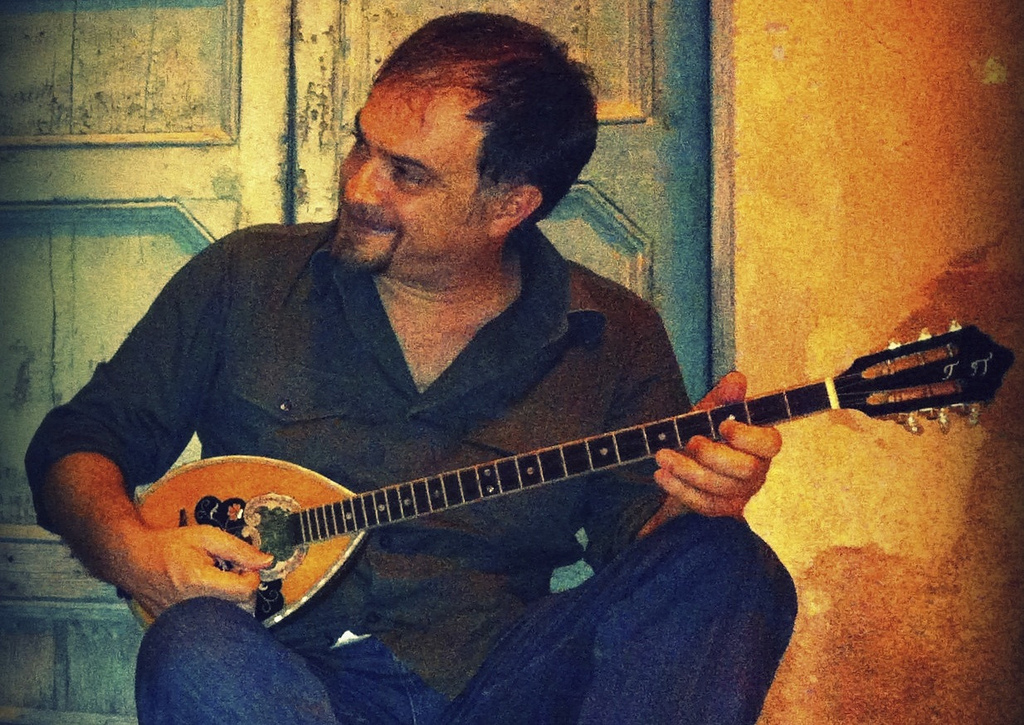
Saro Tribastone playing the Greek Tzouras

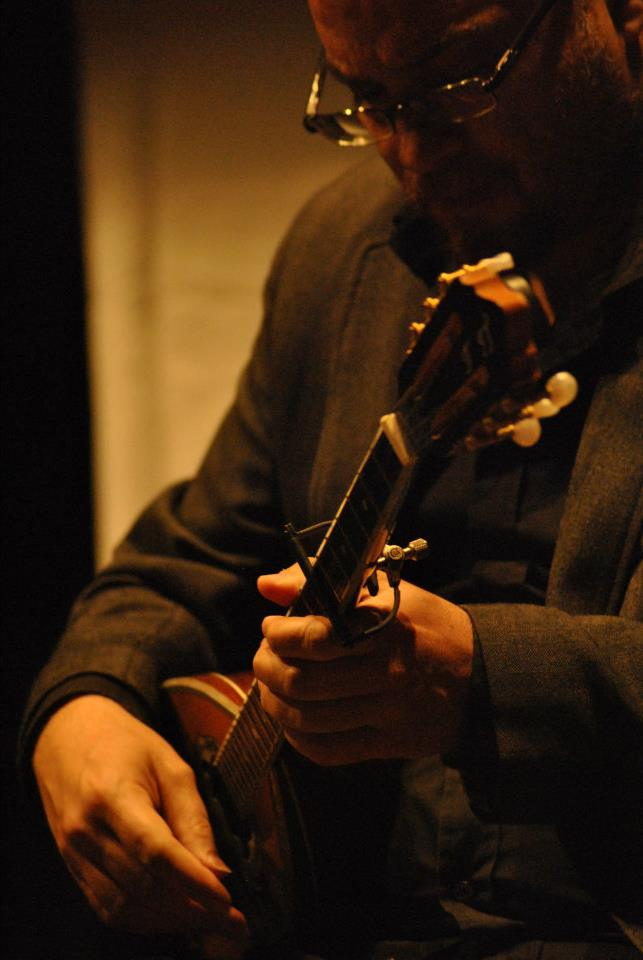
Saro Tribastone playing the Greek Tzouras

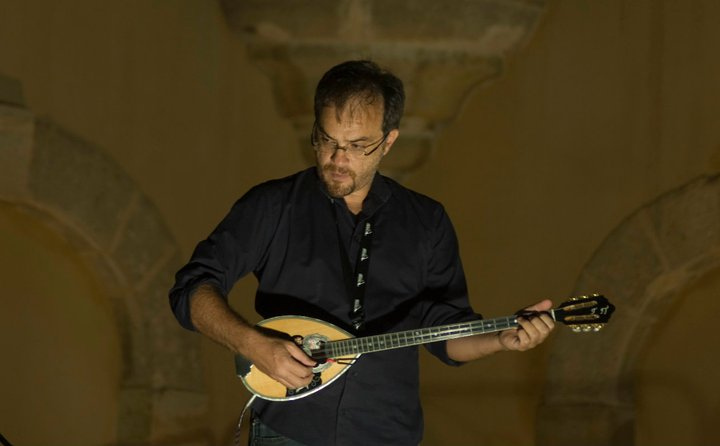
Saro Tribastone playing the Greek Tzouras in a live event

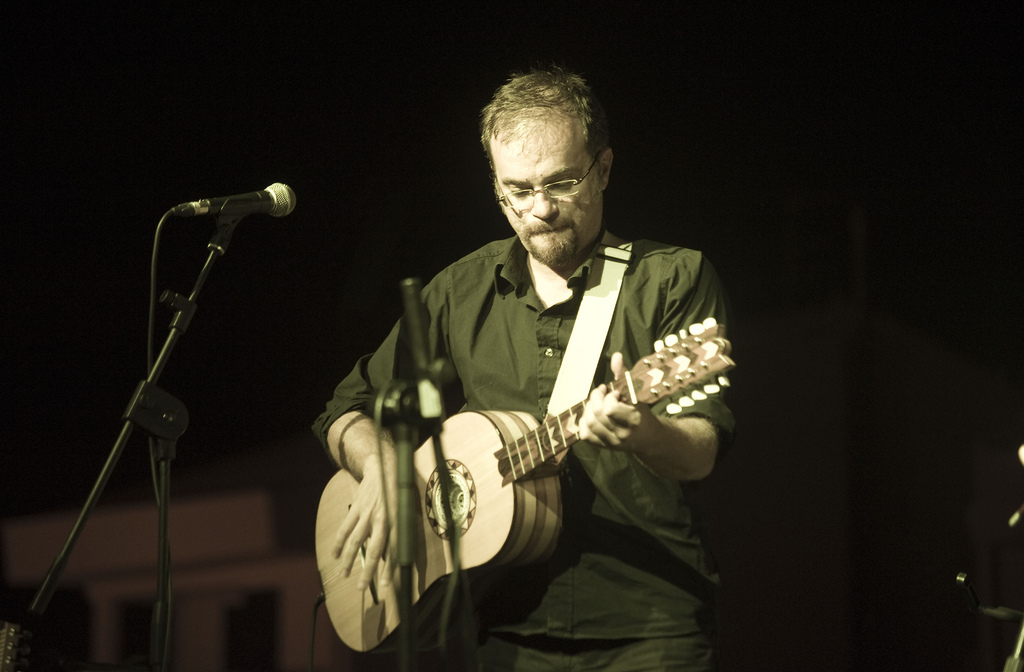
Saro Tribastone playing the Italian guitar live

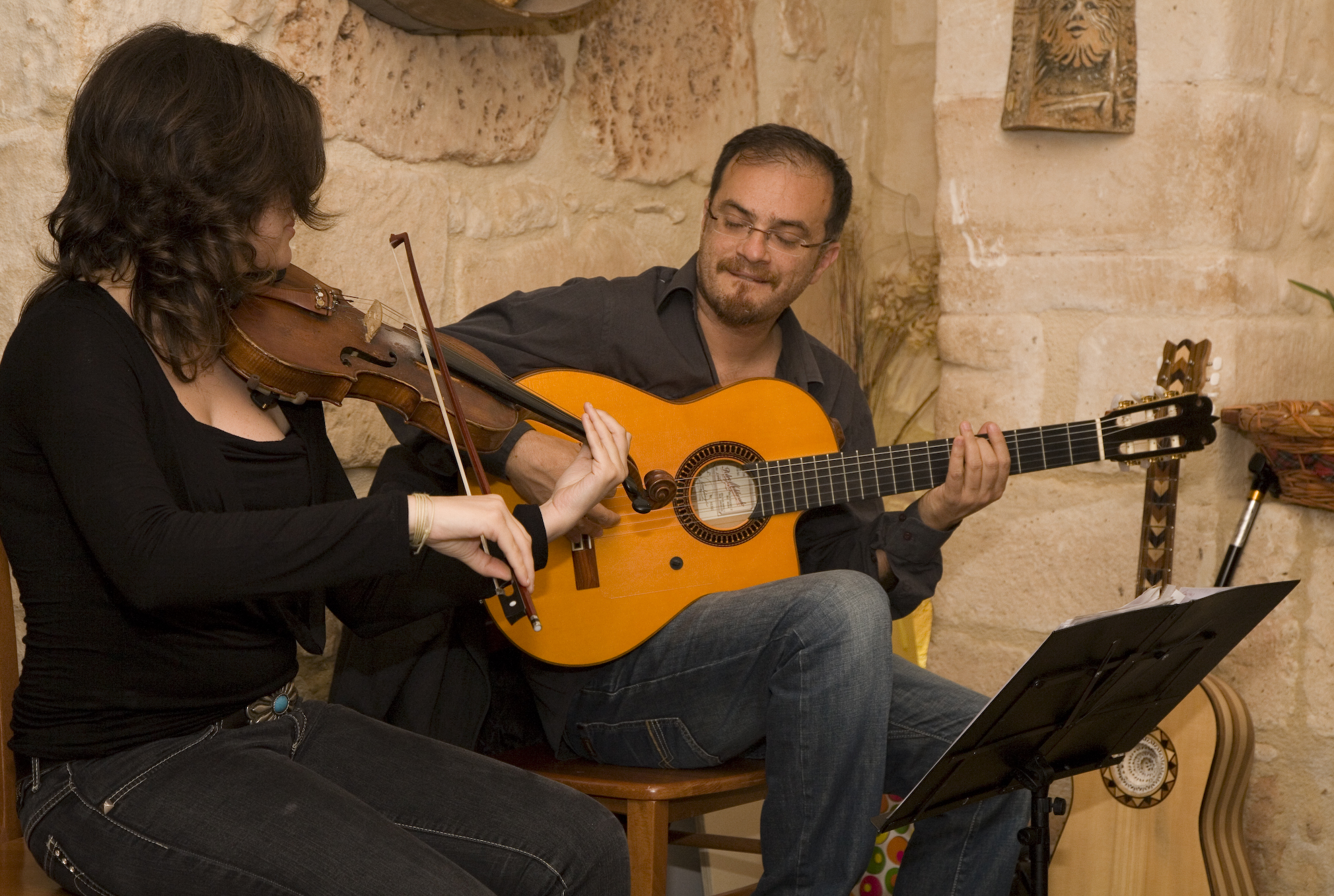
Saro Tribastone performing live

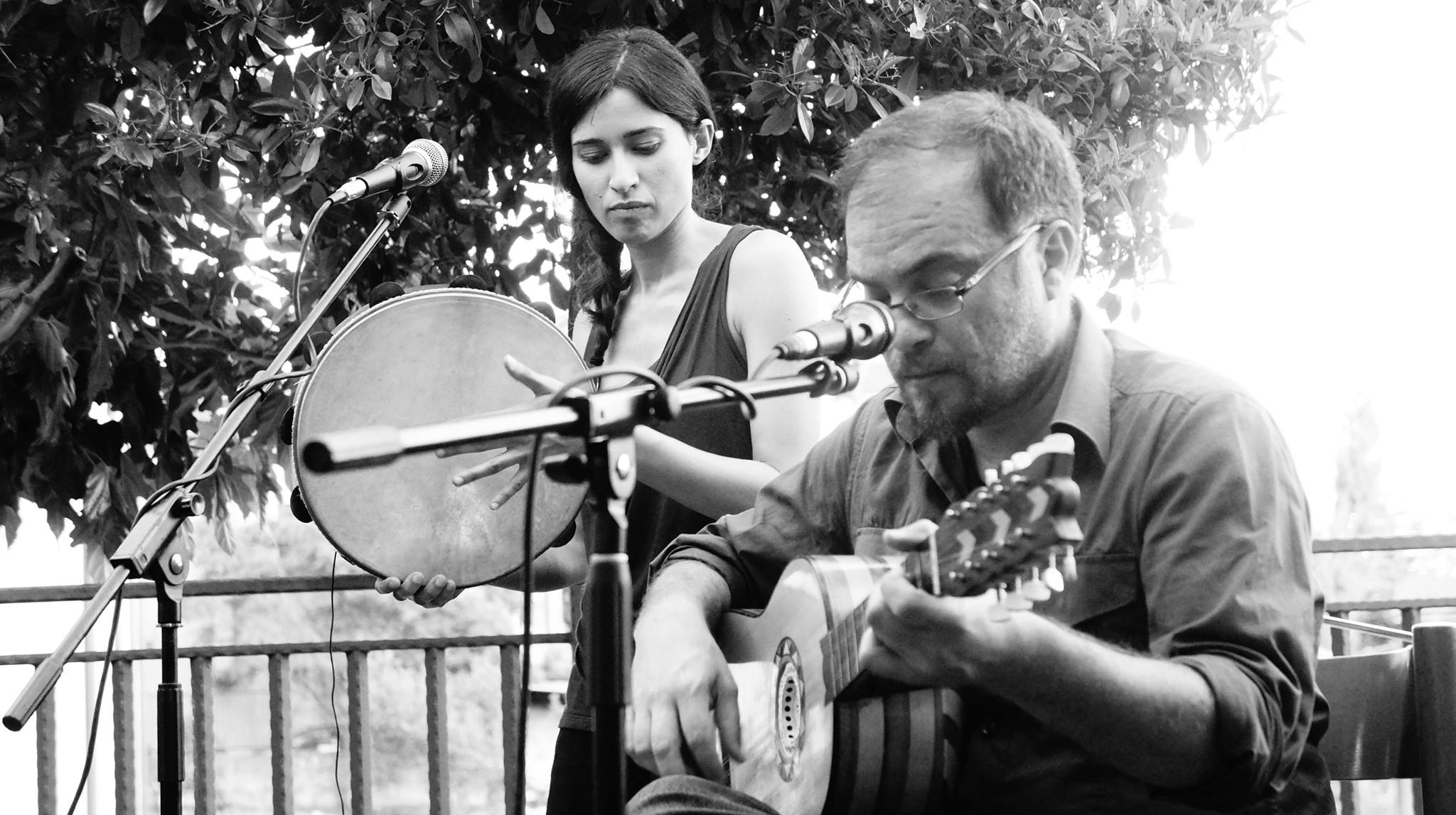
The duo Cordasicula performing live (2013)

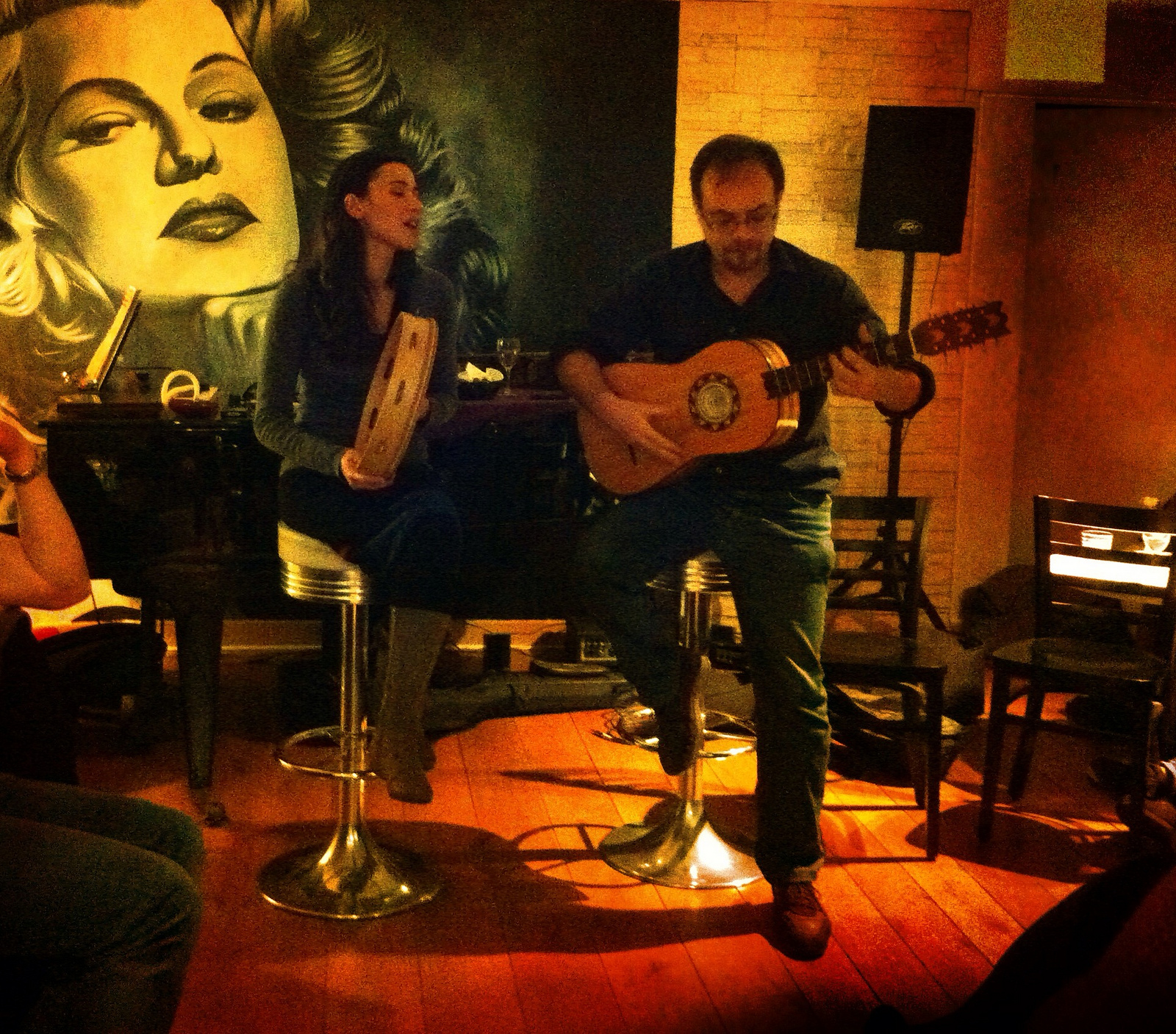
The duo Cordasicula performing live in Paris

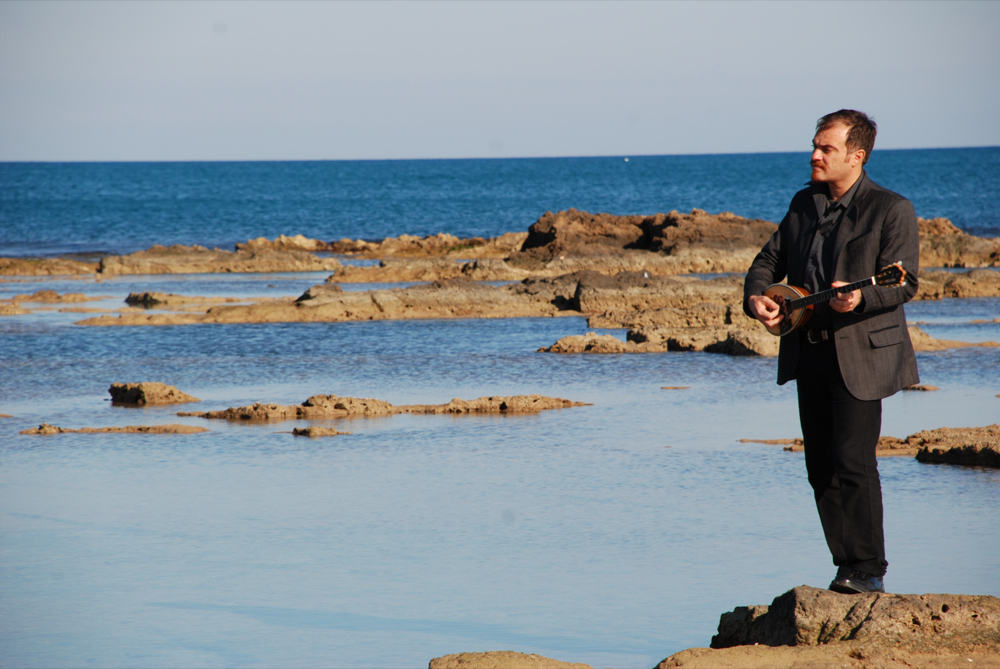
Saro Tribastone playing the Tzouras on the Mediterranean shore

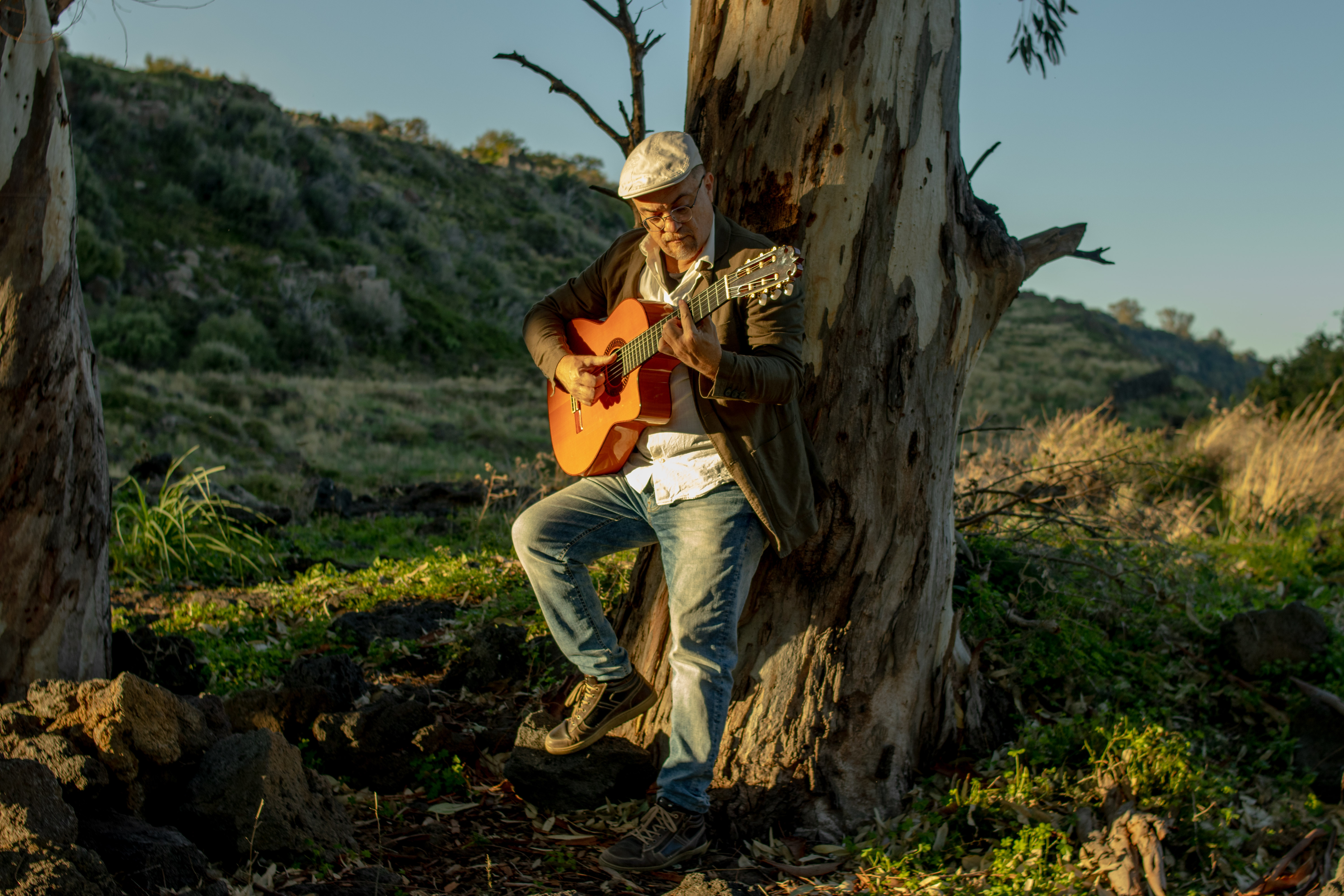

== See also ==
- New Flamenco
- Flamenco rumba
