= Monsieur Doumani =

Music band from Cyprus

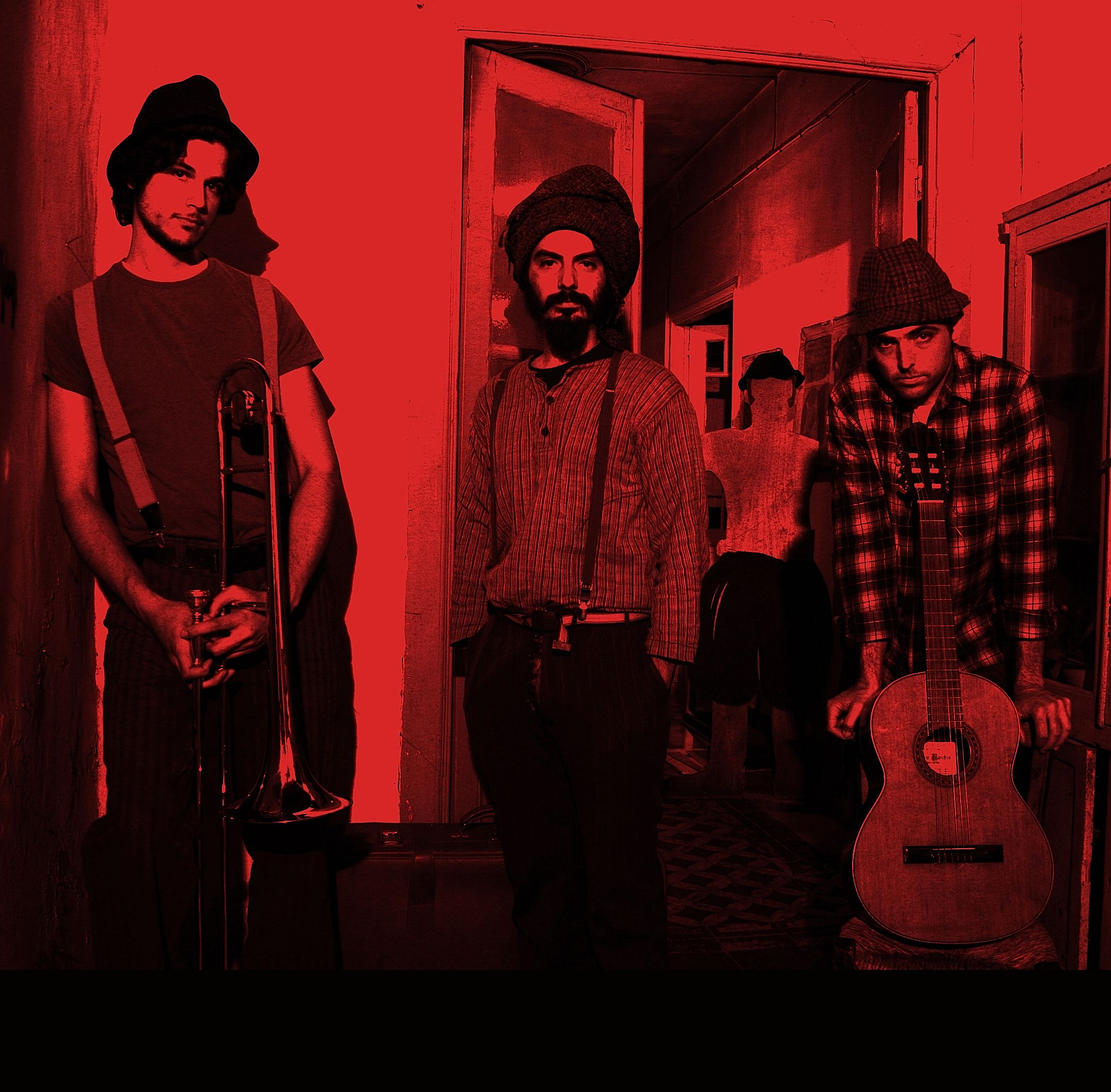

Background information
- Origin: Nicosia, Cyprus
- Genres: World, Cypriot post Folk, Cypriot Traditional Music, Mediterranean, Fusion
- Years active: 2011–present
- Labels: Monsieur Doumani Records
- Members: Antonis Antoniou; Demetris Yiasemides; Andys Skordis; Angelos Ionas (2011-2019)
- Website: monsieurdoumani.com

Monsieur Doumani is a three-piece Cypriot band formed in Nicosia in 2011, winner of the "Best Group" award in the Songlines Music Awards 2019. Monsieur Doumani have performed in major festivals and venues in Europe, including WOMEX, WOMAD Charlton Park, Konzerthaus Vienna, Rudolstadt-Festival, Havana World Music Festival etc.

== Background ==
The band consists of Antonis Antoniou (also member of neo-rebetiko group Trio Tekke) on the tzouras, Angelos Ionas on the guitar and Demetris Yiasemides on the wind instruments. In 2019 Andys Skordis replaced Ionas. The band's music is a blend of the traditional element with modern genres. Coming from different musical backgrounds, but influenced by the Cypriot tradition at various levels, Monsieur Doumani compose Cypriot songs that draw inspiration from contemporary Cypriot society as well as from the shaky conditions of our era. The original identity of the project was determined by the adaptation of Cypriot traditional pieces, with a special contemporary color in sound and mood, forming a style distinctively their own. They first performed live on 28 July 2012 at XORKO Collaborative Arts Movement's festival at Arminou village.

== Awards and Highlights ==
- Awarded with the Best Group Award in Songlines Music Awards 2019
- Awarded with the Preis der deutschen Schallplattenkritik 2018 - German Records Critics' Award 2018
- Awarded with the Critics Award, at Andrea Parodi Music Awards 2018 as well as awards for Best Arrangement, Best Cover of a Parodi song and the Young Audience Award
- Nominated for the Eiserner Eversteiner Award (European Folk Music Awards)
- WOMEX 2019 Official selection
- Transglobal World Music Chart Best Album of the Year 2018
- World Music Charts Europe: #9 Best album of 2018
- 2018 fRoots Critics Poll: #20 Best Album of the Year
- Nominated in Songlines Music Awards 2016 for Best Group
- 2018 fRoots Editor’s choice: Best Independent Albums of the Year
- PopMatters: The Best World Music of 2015
- Nominated in Songlines Music Awards 2014 for Best Newcomer
- European Music Export Exchange Hits From Europe 2017
- Mad TV Awards Cyprus: Nominated for Best Cypriot Group 2015

== Debut EP ==
In 2012 they produced their first limited-edition EP entitled Cyfolk, consisting of eight rearrangements of Cypriot folk songs. The album was distributed only in Italy and it is now out of print.

== Grippy Grappa ==
In May 2013 Monsieur Doumani released its first full-length album entitled Grippy Grappa distributed by Proper Music Distribution. The album was produced in Nicosia, and composed mainly of reworkings of traditional Cypriot pieces.

The album Grippy Grappa was reviewed in The Guardian, Les Inrockuptibles and fRoots. The album was amongst the Top of the World Albums according to the 95th issue of Songlines magazine, and it reached no.12 in World Music Network's August charts. The album gained the group a "Best Newcomer" nomination in the Songlines Music Awards 2014. The video clip of one of the album's songs called 'Out-of-touch guy' reached no.4 on World Music Network's November video charts.

== Sikoses ==
In March 2015, Monsieur Doumani released their second full-length album entitled Sikoses. The album was produced in Nicosia, Cyprus by Monsieur Doumani and consists of 13 tracks, 10 of which are originals and 3 reworkings of traditional Cypriot pieces.

Sikoses was nominated for the Preis der Deutschen Schallplattenkritik in 2015. It was awarded 'Top of the World' in Songlines magazine issue No. 108. The album received nominations in the categories "Best Group" and "Europe" in Songlines Music Awards 2016. Sikoses reached No.1 in World Music Network's June 2015 chart and No.1 in the November 2015 Transglobal World Music Chart.

== Angathin ==
In February 2018, Monsieur Doumani released their third album entitled Angathin. The album consists almost exclusively of original compositions.

Angathin was nominated for the Preis der Deutschen Schallplattenkritik 2018 in the category 'World Music'. It was listed as 'Top of the World' in Songlines magazine issue No. 137. Angathin reached No.1 in the April 2018 Transglobal World Music Chart, as well as No.2 in the World Music Charts Europe.

== Pissourin ==
In September 2021, Monsieur Doumani released their fourth album entitled Pissourin. The album consists of 9 tracks, and is a departure from their largely acoustic previous releases, led by an electrified tzouras.

Pissourin reached No.1 in the October 2021 Transglobal World Music Chart.

== Current members ==
- Antonis Antoniou – Tzouras, Vocals, Stomp Box (2011–present)
- Demetris Yiasemides – Wind instruments, Vocals (2011–present)
- Andys Skordis - Guitar, Vocals, electronics (2016–present)
- Angelos Ionas – Guitar, Vocals (2011–2019)

== Discography ==
- Cyfolk (2012, Monsieur Doumani Records)
- Grippy Grappa (2013, Monsieur Doumani Records)
- Sikoses (2015, Monsieur Doumani Records)
- Angathin (2018, Monsieur Doumani Records)
- Pissourin (2021, GLITTERBEAT)
