= Kuantum 51 =

Studio album by Tarkan
- Released: 14 June 2024
- Recorded: 2023–2024
- Genre: Pop
- Length: 42:27
- Language: Turkish
- Label: Hitt · DMC
- Producer: Tarkan

Tarkan chronology
10 (2017)	Kuantum 51 (2024)

Kuantum 51 (Quantum 51) is the eleventh studio album by Turkish singer Tarkan. It was released on 14 June 2024 by Hitt.

== Release and content ==
Tarkan released his eleventh studio album, Kuantum 51, after a seven-year hiatus, and it consists of a total of 12 songs. Produced by Tarkan, the album features songs written and composed by Tarkan, as well as two songs written by Aysel Gürel and two by Günay Çoban, and one song written and composed by Güler Özince. It also features compositions by Turaç Berkay Özer, Murat Matthew Erdem, and Serkan İzzet Özdoğan. The arrangements were made by İskender Paydaş, Ozan Çolakoğlu, Ateş Berker Öngören, Murat Matthew Erdem, Turaç Berkay Özer, and Mert Kemancı. The production reportedly cost ₺20 million.

Released together with the album were visuals for a select number of songs that were made available on YouTube. The album became the most streamed Turkish album globally at the time of its release. Songs from the album were performed live by Tarkan during his European tour in 2025.

== Reception ==
Initial reactions to the album were mixed on social media. Writing for Milliyet, Mehmet Tez noticed Tarkan's attempt to live up to his old image and lamented his desire to "recreate his image from the 1990s and the first half of the 2000s. ... Today, with Kuantum 51, he repeats what he had attempted in a series of albums, starting with Metamorfoz (2011). He's competing with the megastar Tarkan of 20 years ago. If this is the opponent you are facing, it is impossible to win." Writing for Hürriyet, Sinem Vural also noted that "Tarkan is always expected to deliver the same '90s hits. But he's delivering 'what pop music should be like in 2024'". She added that the album could be catchy and "if you listen to it with your expectations cleared, you will understand Tarkan's new age, his place in his career, his own tastes, and you will memorize the lyrics in a short time". Writing for Sabah, Yüksel Aytuğ found "Müteşekkir" as "the song with the best lyrics on the album" and "Darmaduman" as the only memorable piece. He concluded: "In short, Kuantum 51 made me ask, 'Where are the old Tarkan albums that were all hits?'".

== Track listing ==
Kuantum 51
No.	Title	Writer(s)	Composer(s)	Length
1.	"Yo"	Tarkan	Tarkan	3:45
2.	"İllallah"	Tarkan	Tarkan · İskender Paydaş	3:39
3.	"Olay"	Tarkan	Tarkan	2:58
4.	"Şerbetli"	Günay Çoban	Turaç Berkay Özer	3:14
5.	"Müteşekkir"	Güler Özince	Güler Özince	3:33
6.	"Darmaduman"	Tarkan	Tarkan · Murat Matthew Erdem	3:50
7.	"Ayrılık Töreni"	Aysel Gürel	Tarkan	2:47
8.	"Kalpte Savaş"	Tarkan	Tarkan	3:23
9.	"Çınar"	Aysel Gürel	Serkan İzzet Özdoğan	4:50
10.	"Enseyi Karartma"	Tarkan	Tarkan	3:16
11.	"Sorma Gitsin"	Günay Çoban	Tarkan	3:20
12.	"Vatanımsın"	Tarkan	Tarkan	3:45
Total length:				42:27

== Personnel ==
- Strings: İstanbul Strings
- Acoustic guitar: Erdem Sökmen · Murat Matthew Erdem
- Bass guitar: Erdal Eriş · Alp Ersönmez
- Oboe: Sezai Kocabıyık
- Electric bağlama: İsmail İlgün
- Electric guitar: Alper Çakır · Murat Matthew Erdem · Pau Romero
- Drums · percussion: Mehmet Akatay · İskender Paydaş
- Kaval: Ozan Kurt
- Oud: Özdemir Güz
- Yaylı tambur: Hasan Kiriş
- Guitar: Caner Güneysu · Pau Romero · Danny Kora · Gültekin Kaçar · Metehan Köseoğlu
- Violin: Mert Kemancı
- Bağlama · tarcüş · cura: Ali Yılmaz
- Wind instruments: Eyüp Hamiş
- General coordinator: Volkan Atay
- Mix · mastering: Utku Ünsal
- Vocal recording and edit: Elber Tutkus
- Instrument recording: Ünal Aşkın · Serkan Özyurt
- Video supervisor: Erdi Sevinç
- Video post-producer: Osman Çetinkaya
- Video editor: Çisem Baydar Çetinkaya
- Camera · director: Can Karabulut

== Release history ==
Country	Date	Format(s)	Label
Turkey	14 June 2024	CD · Digital download	Hitt Müzik
Worldwide	14 June 2024	Digital download	Hitt Müzik
