= Karotseris =

"Karotseri"

Song by Glykeria

from the album Η Γλυκερία Σε Λαϊκά & Ρεμπέτικα
- Language: Greek
- Genre: Hasaposerviko
- Songwriter: Unknown

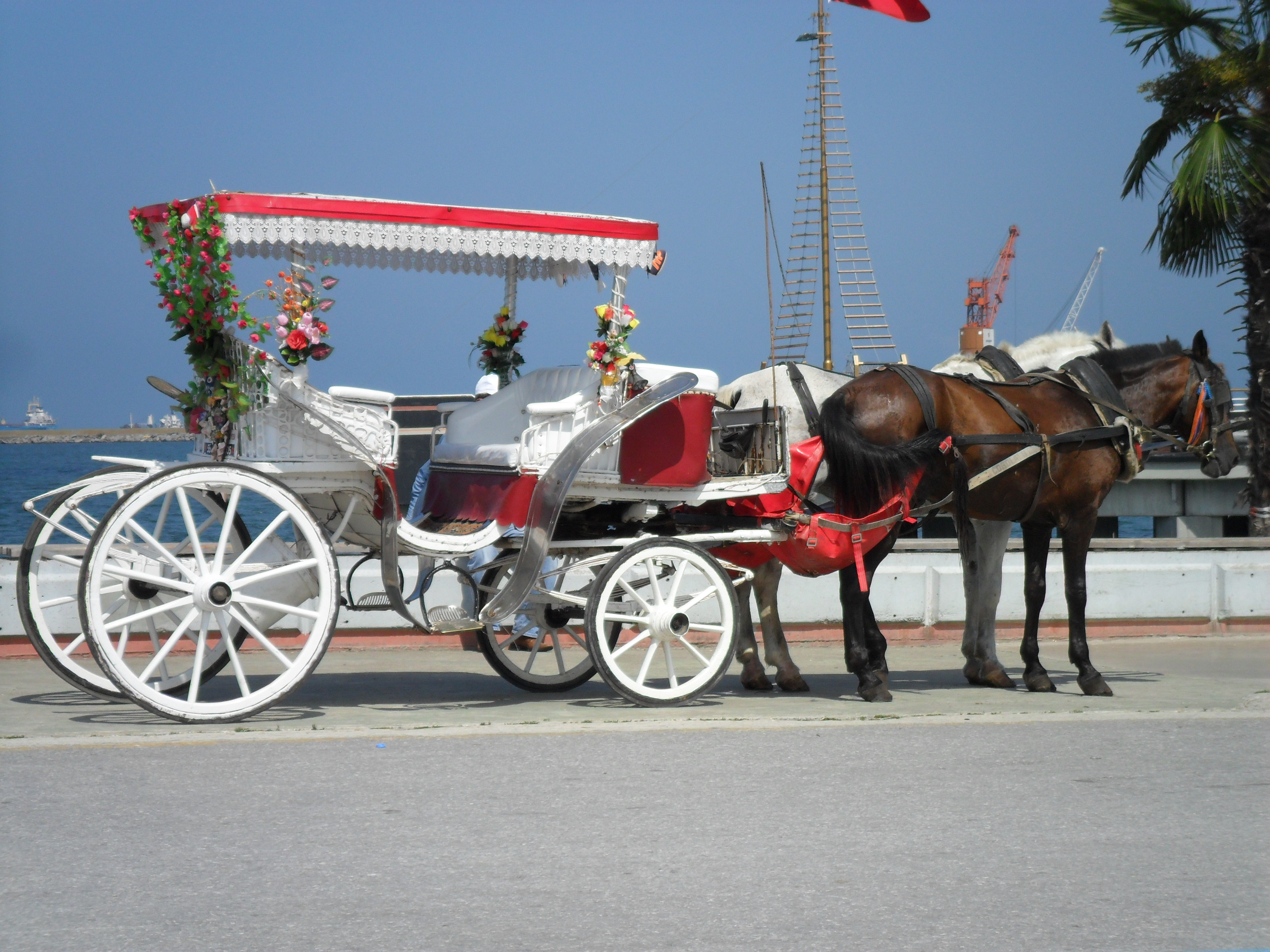

Karotseris (Greek: Καροτσέρης) is a Greek folkloric Hasaposerviko tune. The meter is 2/4.

== Original form ==
The original form of the Hasaposerviko was popular in Constantinople by the Greeks.

== See also ==
- Hasapiko
- Syrtos
- Music of Greece
