= Tatsia =

Cypriot traditional dance

Tatsia ("sieve") is a Cypriot traditional dance, performed with a sieve (tatsia -τατσιά in the Cypriot dialect).

== Description ==
Tatsia is a dance of skill, combining the hand and body in non-stop movement. The dancer holds a sieve in his hand with the four main fingers on the top of the inside perimeter of the sieve, while his thumb is on the top of the outside. Then an assistant of the dancer (usually a woman), or even the dancer himself, puts a glass of wine on the bottom of the inside perimeter of the sieve. The wine within the glass must not exceed the middle of the glass. Then the dancer performs a variety of moves with his hands holding the sieve, as he is dancing to the rhythm. The dancer can put in the sieve as many glasses of wine as he likes. In order to put more than three though a bigger sieve is required as well as a small piece of wood to put on the three base glasses. That small piece of wood is used as a surface on which the other glasses can be put on. In any case the glasses must not touch the top perimeter of the sieve. All of the moves must be performed with speed and grace or else the glass(es) may fall or the wine spilled. The dance was created by the men in Cyprus in a form of competition or as a means to impress a woman. Some of the moves are hard to be performed even by professionals. Tatsia requires the dancer to have stamina, full control of his hands and knowledge of the footwork of the dance.

== Basic moves ==
- 1. The 8 This move is performed in front of the dancer and above his head forming a huge 8. Explaining the move: Dancer starts the move with the palm of the main hand (main hand is the hand that holds the sieve) facing out of his body in front of him. He begins to twist his wrist inwards while his body is leaning over, in order to help the sieve pass under his armpit. As soon as the sieve has passed, the dancer stops twisting his wrist, extends his hand and at the same time raises it, forming a half circle with the sieve above his head. When the sieve passes over his head, the dancer begins to lower his main hand keeping it extended until he reaches the starting position. The other hand stays extended to the side.
- 2. The Reverse 8 This move is exactly the opposite of the 8. The main hand starts at the starting position described earlier. The dancer begins raising his extended main hand to his side creating a big circle. As the sieve reaches the top point of the circle (above the dancer's head) the dancer begins to lower his main hand to complete the circle. Once the circle is almost complete the dancer begins to folding his angle and twist his wrist inwards his body, continuing the circle movement. The sieve passes beneath his armpit and the dancer finishes the move at starting position. This move is significantly harder than the basic 8.
- 3. The Change In this move the dancer changes the sieve from the main hand to his other hand. The move is the 8 move but in the middle of the big circle (above the dancers head) the other hand comes next to the main hand and grabs the sieve. The main hand now releases the grip of the sieve and becomes the other hand. In addition the other hand now becomes the main. The move continuing from the top of the circle is the reverse 8. Any other move will cause the glass(es) to fall off the sieve.
- 4. The Reverse Change The reverse change can be performed only while the dancer is executing a reverse 8. At the end of the big circle, just before the dancer starts to fold his angle, the hand finishes the circle behind the dancers back. The dancer begins to spin around himself at the rotation of the sieve. Simultaneously he brings his other hand behind his back and grabs the sieve. the main hand releases it and becomes the other hand. The main hand now continues to do an 8 move from the point where the dancer raises and extends his arm. The move finishes at the starting position of the 8 move.

== Combinations: expert moves ==
- 1. Windmill In this move the main hand begins in starting position (as described above). The dancer then raises his main hand extended to a full circle beginning outside his body. As soon as the sieve is on 270 degrees the dancer folds his hand and the oleni with the wrist holding the sieve are the ones to complete the circle. As soon as the circle is complete the dancer immediately stops any other movement of his main hand. Then he just reverses the process to complete the move.
- 2. Basic rotation This is a combination of moves. The sequence is: Basic 8-Change-Reverse 8-Reverse Change-Basic 8.
- 3. Knee moves Any of the above moves can be performed while the dancer sits on his knee. This is making the moves much more difficult to be executed and some of them just impossible.
