= Solon Hadjisolomos =

Cypriot musicologist (born 1938)

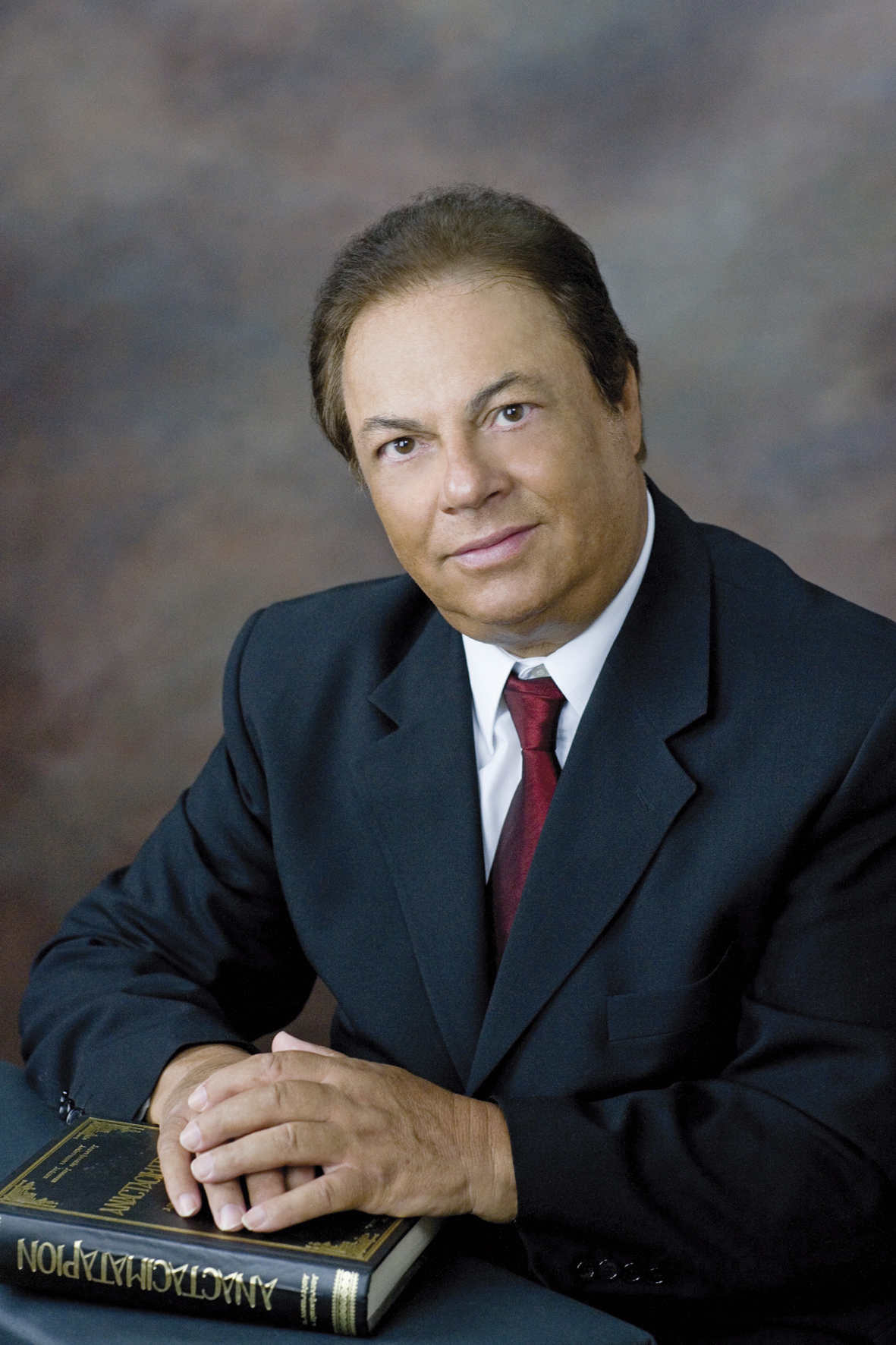
Hadjisolomos in July 2007

Solon J. Hadjisolomos (born 8 October 1938) is a Cypriot musicologist.

== Life and career ==
Hadjisolomos was born in Empa, Paphos, Cyprus on 8 October 1938. He studied Theology and Greek literature at the University of Athens. He also studied Byzantine Music at Athens Conservatoire and at the Greek National Conservatoire, as well as Classical Song (Opera-Monody) at the National Conservatoire.

As a student in Athens, he worked with the late Spyros D. Peristeris, chief Cantor at Metropolitan Cathedral of Athens, in the Research Center for Greek Folklore of the Academy of Athens, where he specialised in folk music. At the same time, he began to sing in the choir of the Athens Cathedral and then at the church of St. Stylianos of Gizi, and later in St. Filothei Temple as well as in Taxiarchae church (Panagia Grigorousa),

In Cyprus Hadjisolomos was a deputy headteacher of middle schools and taught Greek literature and Greek Orthodox doctrine. He also taught also Byzantine Music in the Cyprus National Conservatoire. He also served as chief cantor in various churches. Now is the chief cantor in the Holy Metropolis of Paphos. He is also a Professor of Byzantine Music and Musicology in the Cyprus Greek College of Music.

In 1971 Hadjisolomos founded the Pancyprian Union of Church Singers, and since then he has been the President and Director of its Byzantine Choir, with multiple events and concerts, both in Cyprus (music halls, theatres, radio, television etc.), and abroad (England, France, Syria, Israel, United States, Canada, Italy etc.).

On a scholarship by Archbishop Makarios, he studied at the University of Copenhagen from 1977 to 1982 under the late Jorgen Raasted. In 1985 he received a PhD from the Bulgarian Academy of Sciences, and his doctorate was confirmed by the Department of Music Studies of the National University of Athens.

For several years he served as President of the National Cyprus Music Committee of UNESCO and in 1990 he addressed the General Assembly of the International Committee in Paris. He is a board member of the Center for Scientific Studies of Kykkos Monastery.

A special dedication and reference is made on the publication "21st Century, Cyprus, Volume E", issued by The Foundation Of Ecumenical Hellenism (pages 442-445) www.gnl.gr

== Publications ==
- Byzantine Divine Liturgy, Nicosia 1975. Second edition, improved and extended module, Nicosia, 2004.
- The Modal Structure of the 11 Eothina Anastassima, ascribed to the Emperor Leo (+912), Nicosia-Cyprus, 1985 (PhD).
- The Byzantine Musical Manuscript no .39 of Archbishopric of Cyprus (11th Century), in connection with the so-called Theta Notation, Second International Congress of Cyprus (Proceedings, Volume II, Nicosia, 1986).
- The Medieval Byzantine Ecclesiastical Song, Spiritual Cyprus, Year X., Aug.-Sept. 1984, no.284 – 285, pp. 139–144.
- John Koukouzelis the Maistor, "Kypriaka Themata", Period B, Volume B, 1986, p. 28 et seq.
- The hymn of Kassiani (9th century). In its original musical composition, from the Byzantine Manuscript of Archbishopric of Cyprus no.99 (13th Cent.), referral Yearbook of Cyprus Research Center XIII – XVI, 1.1984 – 1987.
- Parthenios and Silvestros Kykkotes Musicians, Yearbook Kykkos Research Center No. 1, 1990.
- Song for wreath knitting by Matthew the Monk, Yearbook Kykkos Research Center No. 2, 1993.
- Two unknown hymns of the 18th century in honour of the Virgin of Kykkos, Yearbook Kykkos Research Center No. 3, 1996.
- Sofronios Kykkotis, the scholar and musician of the 18th century, Yearbook Kykkos Research Center No. 4, 1999.
- Kontakia in short forms ..., Proceedings 3rd Cyprological International Conference, Volume II, Medieval Department, Nicosia, 2001.
- The exact meaning of "Eksigisis" in Byzantine music and its misunderstanding. Yearbook Kykkos Research Center No. 5, 2001.
- Foreign Influences on Byzantine Ecclesiastical music according to Kykkos Manuscript No. 7 (18th century). Yearbook Kykkos Research Center No. 6, 2004.
- Church Musical tradition and the Holy hymnography in Kykkos, Album of the Holy Monastery of Kykkos, in press.
- Asmatic ceremony book, in honour for Virgin Mary of Apocalypses "Revelation", the version of Kykkos Monastery, Nicosia, 2003.
- Asmatic ceremony for St. Ariston., Bishop Arsinoes (400 A.D.), Paphos, Cyprus, 2000.
- Asmatic ceremony for St. Photios the Alamanos of Athienou, Paphos, Cyprus, 2002.
- "Angeloi Skirtisate", a rare angelic hymn for the Easterer from the Code of the Holy Archbishopric of Cyprus No. 39 (10th–11th cent.), In memory of Jorgen Raasted (13 March 1927 – 5 May 1995), Yearbook of Kykkos Research Center No. 7, 2006.
- Byzantine Akathistos hymn, Nicosia 2004, the series, "Classical Orthodox Melourgia".
- Byzantine Matins, Nicosia 2005, the series, "Classical Orthodox Melourgia".
- Great Byzantine Holy Week, Nicosia 2006, the series, "Classical Orthodox Melourgia".
- Byzantine burial ceremony, Nicosia 2006, the series "Classical Orthodox Melourgia".
- Byzantine Calendar (Heortologion) (Doxastarion of Matins, movable and immovable celebrations), Nicosia 2006, the series "Classical Orthodox Melourgia".
- Handbook of History of Byzantine Music, Hymnology liturgy Church ritual diction readings, Paphos – Cyprus 2006.
- Byzantine Vesper, Nicosia 2007, the series "Classical Orthodox Melourgia".
- Efthymios Kykkotis, the musician and the composer (1798), Yearbook Kykkos Research Center No. 8, 2008.
- Two Byzantine Musical Manuscripts of Archbishopric of Cyprus in the Round Notation (12th–13th cent.) (4th International Cyprological Congress, Nicosia, April – May 2008) (Medieval Section) etc.

== Honors ==
- Grand Cross of the Greek Orthodox Church of France (1991) by the Ecumenical Patriarchate.
- Grand Cross and Order of Apostles Peter and Paul, and an honorary diploma from the Orthodox Patriarch of Antioch Mr. Ignatius the 4th (14 March 2002), where he stressed the contribution to the Church in general and specifically in Byzantine music, and also contributed significantly to the promotion of relations of Orthodox Church of Cyprus and Antioch-Syria.
- Honorary Diploma and a permanent annual grant from the President of the Republic of Cyprus Tassos Papadopoulos, for his Contribution in Building the Contemporary Cultural Significance of Cyprus (27 December 2006).
- Higher Honorary Distinction, on behalf of the Holy Metropolis of Paphos, Cyprus, by the award of the Golden Paramours of The Apostles Barnabas and Paul, together with an Honorary Diploma - Parchment "For his great contribution to studying, performing and promoting Byzantine music in general, and for elevating the congregation from earthen world to heaven, through his sweet singing and absolute performance" (8 February 2012).
