= Methysos =

Cypriot folk metal band

MethysOs
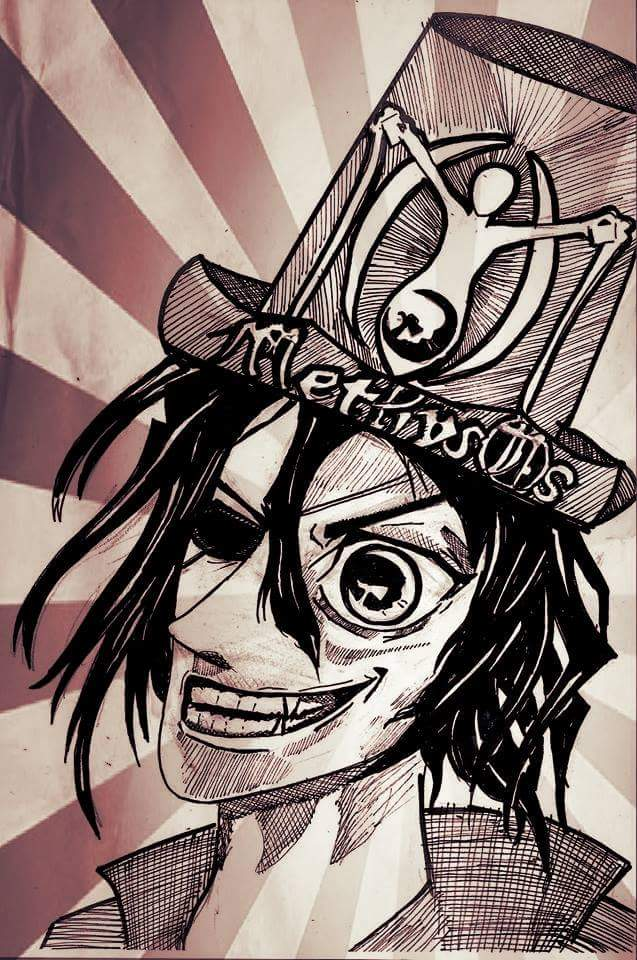

Background information
- Origin: Limassol, Cyprus
- Genres: Folk metal
- Years active: 2011–present
- Members: Mario Kenji; George Satyros; George Zeus; Nidal; CK Madman
- Website: Official site

MethysOs is a Cypriot folk metal band formed in Limassol, Cyprus in 2011. MethysOs has remained active in the Cyprus metal scene since its formation. The band has shared the stage with bands such as Uriah Heep (band), Mnemic and Grave Digger (band). Methysos is the first and only folk metal band from Cyprus.

== History ==
The band was formed officially in November 2011 when George Satyros and Mario Kenji decided to materialise their passion for folk metal music. The founding members also co-existed in various local bands in the past. The lyrical theme of the band entails myths, legends and folk stories from around the world. The band name is a Greek word for drunkard.

In March 2012, the band released its first work, a demo titled Beyond Myths and Legends. The three tracks of the demo, were then recorded again and included in their debut album.

Following a warm welcome from the local scene Methysos were called up to support bands including Clepto, Armageddon, Mnemic, Grave Digger (band) and Uriah Heep (band).

Many live shows and some band member changes later, the band took its current line-up in March 2014 when George Zeus and CK Madman joined forces with the band. In this form the band released in March 2016, and after almost a year of work on the album, their debut titled Folkloria. An official video clip for "Drink Loud – Drink Proud" and a lyric video for "Waltz with the Gods" was also released to support the album. The band has released their second album, Jukai, in February 2018.

== Members ==
=== Current line-up ===
- Mario Kenji – Bass, Vocals
- George Satyros – Drums
- George Zeus – Guitar
- Nidal Guitar
- CK Madman- Keys

== Discography ==
=== Albums ===
- Beyond Myths and Legends (demo album) (2012)
- Folkloria (2016)
- Jukai (2018)
