= Tzouras =

Greek stringed musical instrument related to the bouzouki

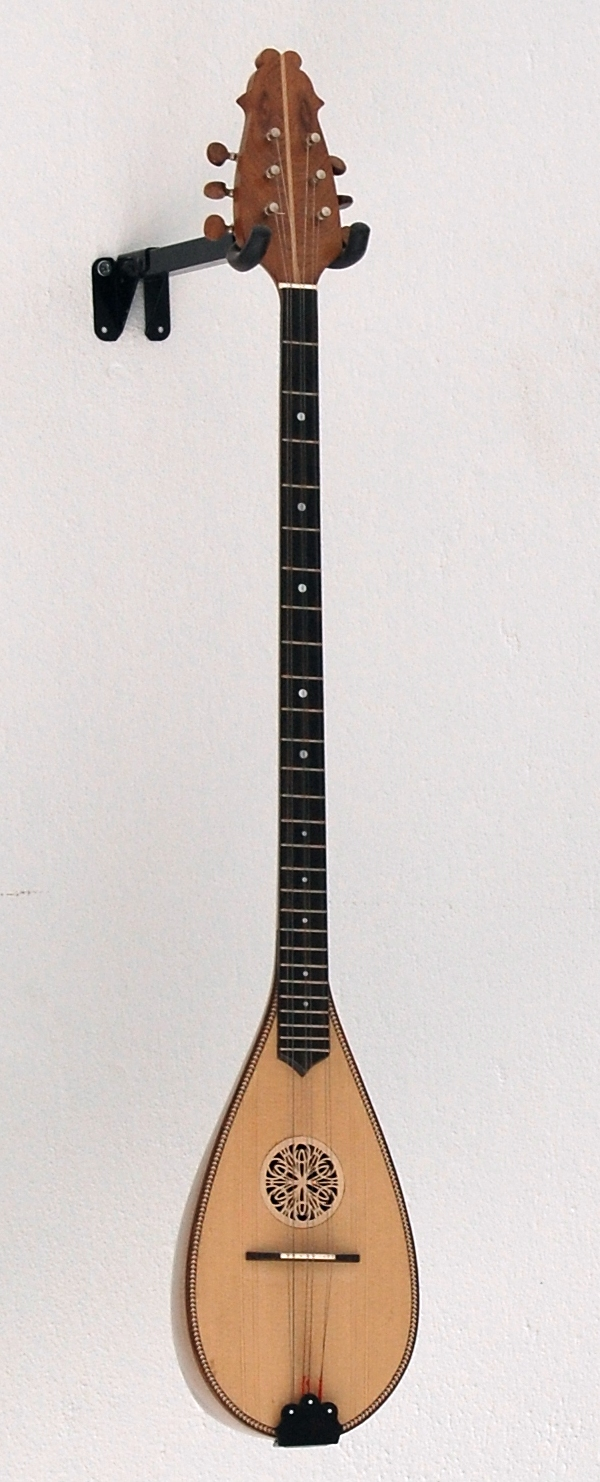

String instrument
- Classification: String instrument
- Hornbostel–Sachs classification: 321.321 (string instrument with a pear-shaped body and a long neck, played with plectrum)
- Developed: Greece

Related instruments
- Bouzouki, Baglamas, Saz

The tzouras (Greek: τζουράς), is a Greek stringed musical instrument related to the bouzouki. Its name comes from the Turkish cura. It is made in six-string and eight-string varieties. Similar musical instruments in Turkish culture are generally referred to as Bağlama.

The six-string model has the same arrangement of strings tuned to the same pitches as the six-string (trichordo) bouzouki. There are three pairs of strings, tuned to D_{3}D_{4}–A_{3}A_{3}–D_{4}D_{4} or D_{4}D_{3}–A_{3}A_{3}–D_{4}D_{4}. The strings are made of steel.

Physically, the tzouras resembles the bouzouki, with a similar neck and head, but stands out due to its notably smaller body, resulting in a distinct tonal quality.

== Notable players ==
- Saro Tribastone
- Mikal Cronin

== See also ==
- Baglamas
- Greek musical instruments
- Greek music
- Pandura
- Cretan lyra
