= Nicosia Music Society =

Organization for Greek-Cypriot music

The Nicosia Music Society was established in 1971 as "Zenon" choir of Larnaca by composer and Professor of Music Michael Hadjiloizou, a certified choir director and the first Cypriot to compose operas/melodramas, who has since been the Society's president and artistic director.

== Organization ==
NMS is an officially registered organization under the Ministry of Education and Culture of the Republic of Cyprus and it is run by a five-member board of directors. It includes:

- Four-voice mixed chorus, dramatic, and melodramatic group.
- Department of social givings.
- Orchestra.

According to its constitution, NMS's basic pursuit is the projection of Greek-Cypriot music creation through all artistic expression.

== Performance ==
The chorus has appeared in over 800 performances on radio and television stations, in religious, patriotic and social events, concerts, and festivals.

The Society has made numerous trips abroad, touring major cities in Austria, Belarus, Bulgaria, Canada, China, Czech Republic, England, Estonia, Greece, Hungary, Italy, Jordan, Latvia, Poland, Slovakia, and Slovenia.

Under the direction of Mr. Hadjiloizou, NMS has published three original records: i. Του Λαού και της Πατρίδας ("Tou Laou kai tis Patridas", Of the People and Fatherland), ii. Ελλήνων Μαρτυρία ("Ellinon Martyria", Greek Confession), iii. Ορθοδόξων Μαρτυρία ("Orthodoxon Martyria", Orthodox Confession).

NMS is the organizer of the Annual Cyprus Christmas and Religious Song Festival, which is the biggest Christmas event and the oldest festival in Cyprus.

The first Cypriot organization to present complete operas/melodramas in Cyprus written by a Cypriot composer (Michalis Hadjiloizou) and performed by Cypriot artists:

- ΕΛΕΥΘΕΡΙΑ ("ELEFTHERIA", LIBERTY). The first Cypriot opera. Libretto and Music by Michalis Hadjiloizou. First performance: May 23, 1977 at the Theatre of the Professional School of Larnaca.
- 9η Ιουλίου 1821 – Το Τραούδιν του Τζιυπριανού ("Ennati Iouliou 1821 - To Traouthin tou Tzyprianou", 9 July 1821 – The Song of Kyprianos). Based on the poem of Vassilis Michaelides.
- Επική Ραψωδία ("Epiki Rapsodia", Epic Rhapsody). Libretto based on the poetry of the Cypriot heroes as collected in the book of Ms Panayiota Ioannou "Το Έπος της ΕΟΚΑ" ("To Epos tis EOKA", The Epos of EOKA).
- Κύπρος Εάλω ("Kypros Ealo", Cyprus Ealo). Libretto by the composer.
- ΕΠΙΤΑΦΙΟΣ ("EPITAFIOS", Epitaph). Libretto by Antonis Pillas.
- ΖΗΔΡΟΣ (Zidros). Libretto based on the poetry of the Cypriot heroes as collected in the book of Ms Panayiota Ioannou "Το Έπος της ΕΟΚΑ" (The Epos of EOKA).

Other special moments include the world premiers of Michalis Hadjiloizou's musical transformations of Dionysios Solomos' Ελεύθεροι Πολιορκημένοι ("Eleftheri Poliorkimeni", Free Besieged) and Kostis Palamas' Ο Δωδεκάλογος του Γύφτου ("O Dodekalogos tou Gyftou", The Twelve Words of the Gypsy), and the composer's own Καρπασία (Karpasia), Επιτάφιος Θρήνος ("Epitafios Thrinos", Epitaph Lamentation), the Liturgy of Saint John the Chrysostom, the Wedding Liturgy, and numerous of his original Cypriot Suites.

Fixed annual appearances include: 1. Cyprus Christmas and Religious Song Festival, 2. Artistic Tea, 3. Encomium – Epitaph Lamentation on Great Friday, 4. Annual Concert, and 5. International Tour in the summer.

NMS's repertoire stretches from Byzantine/sacred works to popular songs and from operas/melodramas to traditional folk music.
