= Andys Skordis =

Cypriot composer

Andys Skordis (Nicosia,1983) is a Cypriot composer. Skordis was awarded the Buma Toonzetters Prize 2012 for the best Dutch composition for that year, as well as the Berlin Opera Prize 2022.

== Biography ==
Andys Skordis (Cyprus, 1983) studied composition and film scoring at Berklee College of Music, graduating in 2007. He followed his postgraduate studies in composition at the Conservatorium van Amsterdam, studying with Richard Ayres and Wim Henderickx, graduating in 2011. Skordis has also studied Karnatic music at the Conservatorium van Amsterdam, Javanese gamelan with Elsje Plantema and Balinese gamelan at Indonesian Institute of the Arts, Denpasar.

His work list includes more than eighty compositions, consisting mostly of operas, orchestral and chamber music, oratorios, gamelan pieces and music for theatre, dance and short films. Skordis' music has been featured at renowned contemporary festivals, including Holland Festival, November Music, Gaudeamus Muziekweek, Bali Arts Festival, Voix Nouvelles, CTM Festival, Unsafe and Sounds, and Symphony for Asia. He has received commissions from Neuköllner Oper, Athens & Epidaurus Festival, International Ensemble Modern Academy, Gettysburg Symphony Orchestra, Third Coast Percussion group, Orkest de Ereprijs, Cyprus Symphony Orchestra, and more. He has also created and conducted various music theatre performances in unconventional locations such as Temples, abandoned buildings, forests, floating stages, staircases and more.

Andys has received international recognition for his work, through prizes including the Buma Toonzetters Prize 2012 (composer of the year in The Netherlands), the Berlin Opera Prize 2022 , the Black Pencil Prize 2020, the Category A Prize at the International Competition Jaume Padrós 2026, the 1st and 2nd prizes in orchestral competitions by the Cyprus Symphony orchestra, as well as further awards from ISCM Korea, Iceland, Mexico, Indonesia, Cyprus, the Netherlands and USA. Additionally, he was selected as a composer in residence by Third Coast Percussion group, and he was part of the team at the National Opera of Greece that was awarded with the Fedora prize, for the project CO-OPERAtive. In 2026, he received the Award for Artistic Creation by the National Theater of Cyprus.

In opera and theater, he has collaborated with directors such as Michael Marmarinos, Thanos Papakonstantinou, Themelis Glynatsis, Martha Frintzila, Miriam Goetz, Jelena Vuksanović, and Elia Kalogianni, as well as choreographers Venetsiana Kalampaliki, Demetris Mytilinaios, and Elena Christodoulidou. Besides composing he is the founder of the contemporary ensemble “PATSIAOURA” and the Athens Gamelan Orchestra, which he directs. He is an active performer with his bands “OGMIOS” and Monsieur Doumani, and he is member of the board of directors of Insitu Recordings. Together with Jelena Vuksanovic they also created the Ritual Opera Collective, presenting works of new music theater in site specific locations. He has also been a lecturer at the Conservatorium Van Amsterdam from 2018-2023, teaching Advanced rhythm composition and improvisation, a topic which he also taught in various foundations worldwide.

== Awards – selection ==
- 2007 Best Music Film – C.I.F.F
- 2007 Best Contemporary Film Music – N.I.F.F
- 2010 2nd prize for "Stin Vrysin ton Poion?” – Cyprus Symphony Orchestra
- 2011 Finalist for "Silkstone…are you ever going to shatter? – Orkest de Ereprijs
- 2012 Buma Toonzetters Prize for The deeper you go...the deeper you go...the deeper you go...deeper you go...you go...you? – Buma Cultuur & MCN
- 2012 Finalist for "7 unceremonious occasions" – Gaudeamus Muziekweek
- 2013 1st prize for "O Ippis…Tou Ippi…E Ippei…Poios Ippei?” – Cyprus Symphony Orchestra
- 2016 International Competition for Piano Quintet for "17…why not 37?”, ISCM Korea and Asia Cultural Center
- 2019 Currents Creative Partnership – Third Coast Percussion group
- 2019 Fedora Prize for education, Opera & Ballet – Co-Operative, Greek National Opera
- 2020 Black Pencil Prize
- 2022 Berlin Opera Prize
- 2026 Award for Artistic Creation, National Theater Awards Cyprus.
- 2026 1st prize international competition Jaume Padrós.

== Selected works ==
- "tattar...rattat" - Song cycle, 2024
- "Zusammen Fallen" - Opera, 2023
- "β" - Song Cycle, 2023
- "Argos Sidiros" – Opera, 2021
- "R.I.N" – percussion quartet, 2020
- "U...ZU" – Septet, 2019
- "In...Se..." – Opera for Gamelan, 2018
- "Ra…Patsia…Ou" – Opera, 2016
- "Ou…Da" – Chamber Ensemble and electronics, 2016
- "E…Sou…A?" – Oratorio for Gamelan and Choir, 2015
- "Kra…Ne" – Piano trio, 2015
- "Ou…Patsia…Ra" – Opera, 2014
- "An empty something…something empty…” – Large Ensemble, 2013
- "Tir…Mbo" – chamber ensemble, 2013
- "17…why not 37?” – piano quintet, 2013
- "Ο Ιππής...Του Ιππή...Ε Ιππή...Ποιός Ιππεί;” – Ballet for Symphony Orchestra, 2012
- "The deeper you go…the deeper you go…the deeper you go…deeper you go…you go…you?” – Large Ensemble and 5 Soprano, (2011)
- "So we commence…where?” – Piano trio, 2011
- "7 unceremonious occasions" – Brass quintet, 2010
- “...... – Στην Βρύσην των ποιών;” – Symphony Orchestra, 2010
- "Extrasolar Voices in an Absentminded Land" – Oratorio for large ensemble and Choir, 2009
