= Mushtaqieh Dome =

Shi'ite mausoleum complex in Kerman, Iran

Moshtaqiyeh Dome
- گنبد مشتاقیه
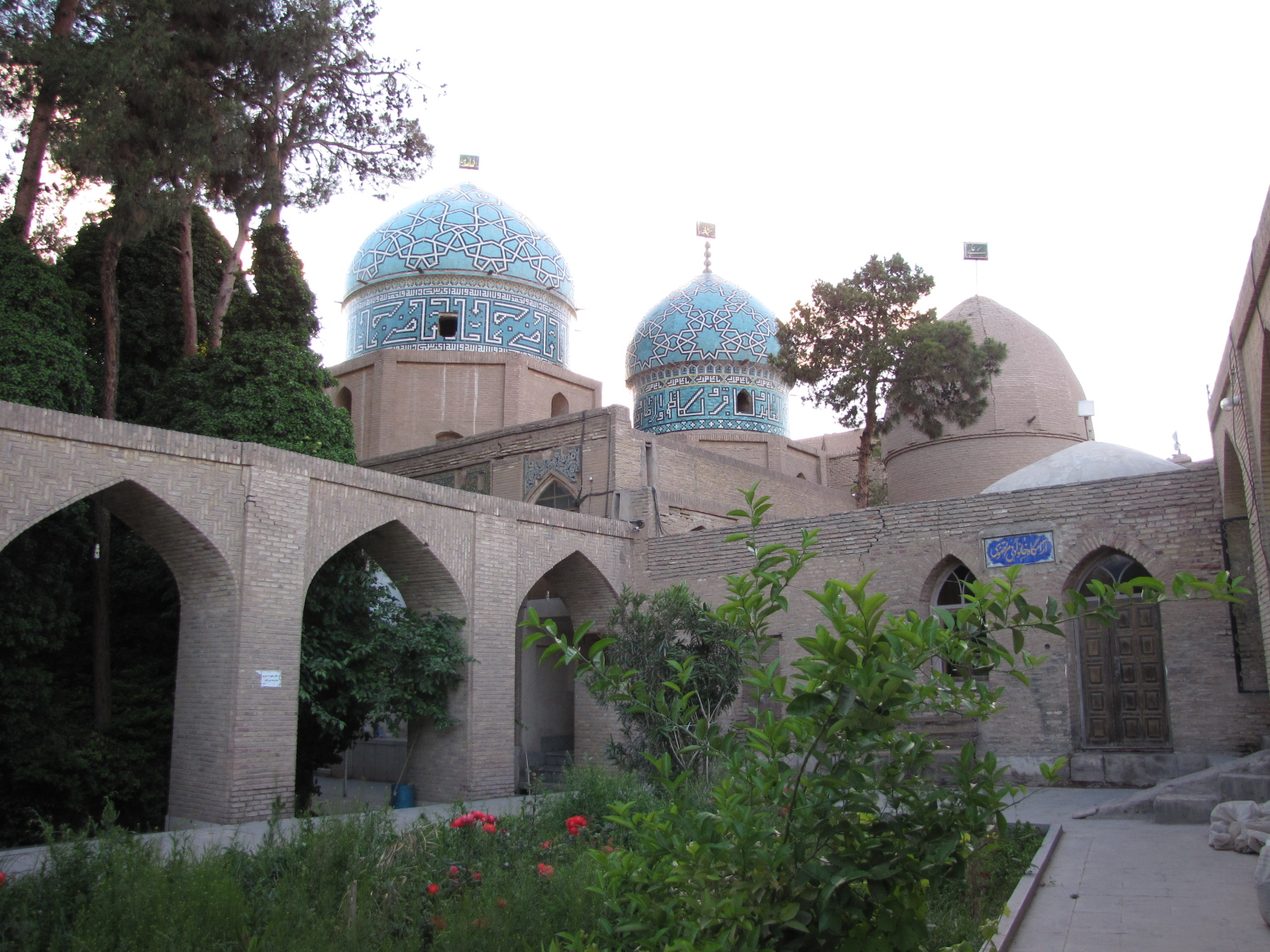

- Location of the complex in Iran

Religion
- Affiliation: Shia Islam
- Ecclesiastical or organizational status: Mausoleum
- Year consecrated: 1792
- Status: Active

Location
- Location: Kerman, Kerman province
- Country: Iran
- Interactive map of Moshtaqiyeh Dome
- Coordinates: 30°17′35″N 57°05′17″E

Architecture
- Type: Persian architecture
- Style: Qajar
- Completed: 1838

Specifications
- Dome: 3
- Materials: Bricks; plaster; tiles
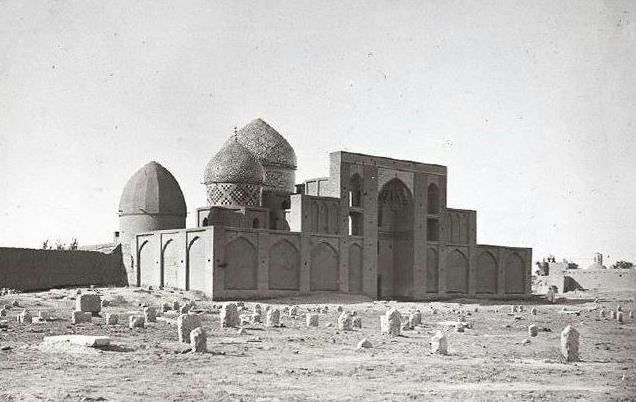
- The complex of Mushtaqieh Dome during the rule of Mozaffar ad-Din Shah Qajar, 1900

Iran National Heritage List
- Official name: Mushtaqieh Dome
- Type: Built
- Designated: 21 March 1966
- Reference no.: 525
- Conservation organization: Cultural Heritage, Handicrafts and Tourism Organization of Iran

The Mushtaqieh Dome (Persian: گنبد مشتاقیه, lit. 'Moshtaqiyeh Dome' (Note: Also romanized as Moshtaghieh Dome.)) is a Shi'ite mausoleum complex, located in the city of Kerman, in the province of Kerman, Iran. The complex is also known as Three Domes (سه‌گنبدان). The current building dates from the reign of Mohammad Shah Qajar in 1838.

The complex was added to the Iran National Heritage List on 21 March 1966, and is administered by the Cultural Heritage, Handicrafts and Tourism Organization of Iran.

== History ==
The first burial was for Mirza Hossein Khan, the minister of the last Zand ruler, Lotf Ali Khan, and a tomb was built for him. In 1792, Mushtaq Ali Shah a dervish of the Nimatullahi order, was stoned to death during the reign of Fath-Ali Shah Qajar, for using a setar in a mockery of the Qur'an. He was buried here, next to Mirza Hossein Khan, and then a mausoleum was built over his grave. The whole site became named after him. At some point, the Qajar regent, Mohammad Esmail Khan Vakil-ol-Molk, built a mausoleum for another mystic, Shaykh Ismail al-Herati.

The complex was also expanded to include the tombs of Mushtaq Ali Shah's disciples and followers, such as a tomb for a poet who is a purported descendant of Nasir al-Din Tusi.

== Architecture ==
There are three tombs in the complex. These tombs belong to Mushtaq Ali Shah, his student Kausar Ali Shah, and the mystic Shaykh Ismail al-Herati. Each tomb is topped by a dome. The complex also includes a mosque and a dervish lounge.

=== Mausoleum of Mushtaq Ali Shah ===
This mausoleum is located in the north of the complex, in front of a garden. It is also the namesake of the whole complex. The dome topping Mushtaq Ali Shah's mausoleum is made of brick and covered with decorative tiles, that were added at a later period and were not present in the original Qajar era structure. Inside the mausoleum, it is not only Mushtaq Ali Shah buried, but next to his grave is buried one of his disciples, a dervish named Ja'far. Zand minister, Mirza Hossein Khan, is also buried there.

=== Mausoleum of Kausar Ali Shah ===
The dome looks very similar to that of Mushtaq Ali Shah's mausoleum. This dome is also made of brick and covered with decorative tiles, which also did not exist in the original structure, and were in fact, a later addition.

=== Shaykh Herati's Tomb ===
Shaykh Herati's Tomb is made out of brick, including its dome. It is the only dome in the complex to not have any tiling. Despite its plain look which is drab in contrast to the other two mausoleums, Shaykh Herati's Tomb is considered by locals to be more spiritual.

== Gallery ==
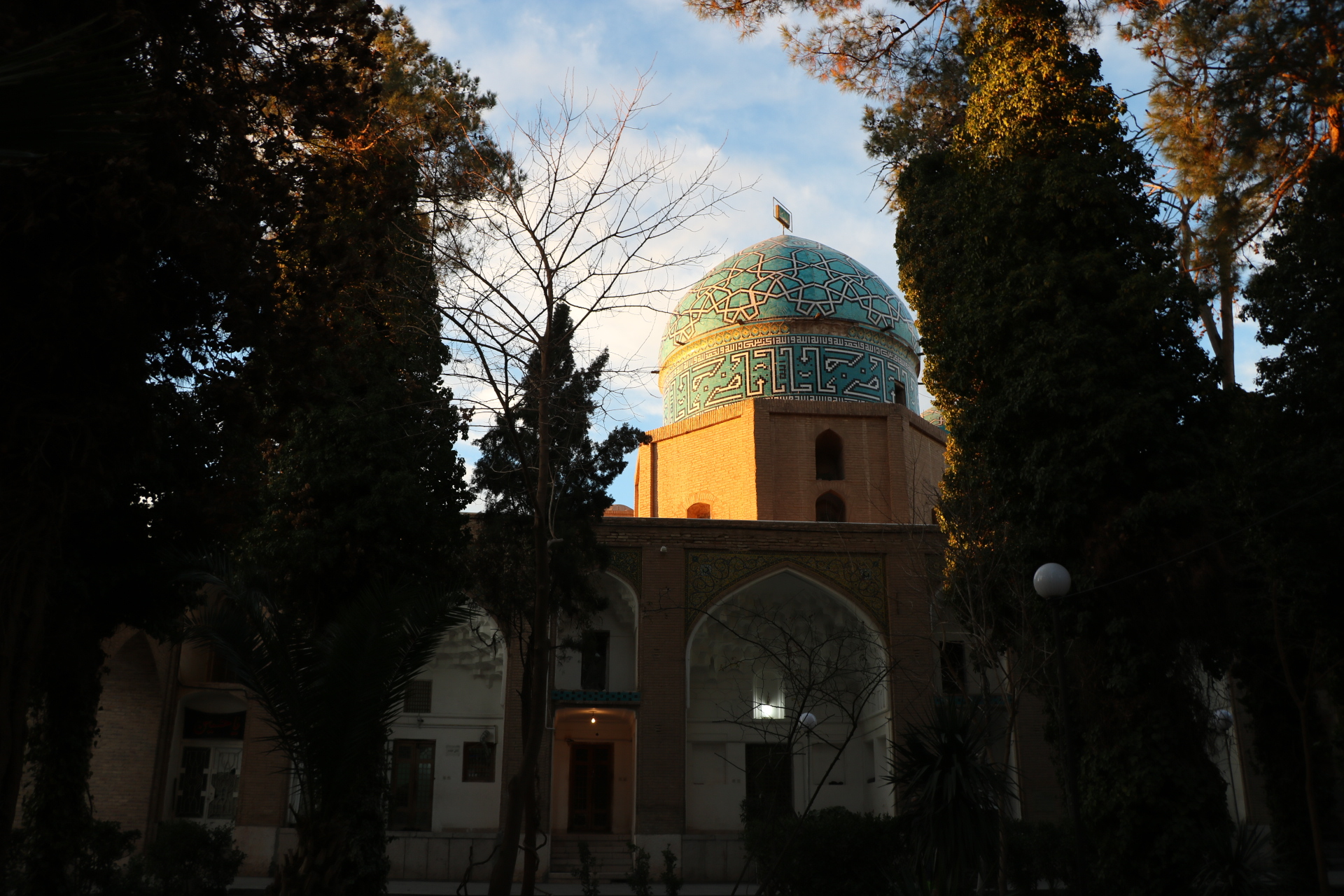
Sunlight glistens over the tomb of Mushtaq Ali Shah

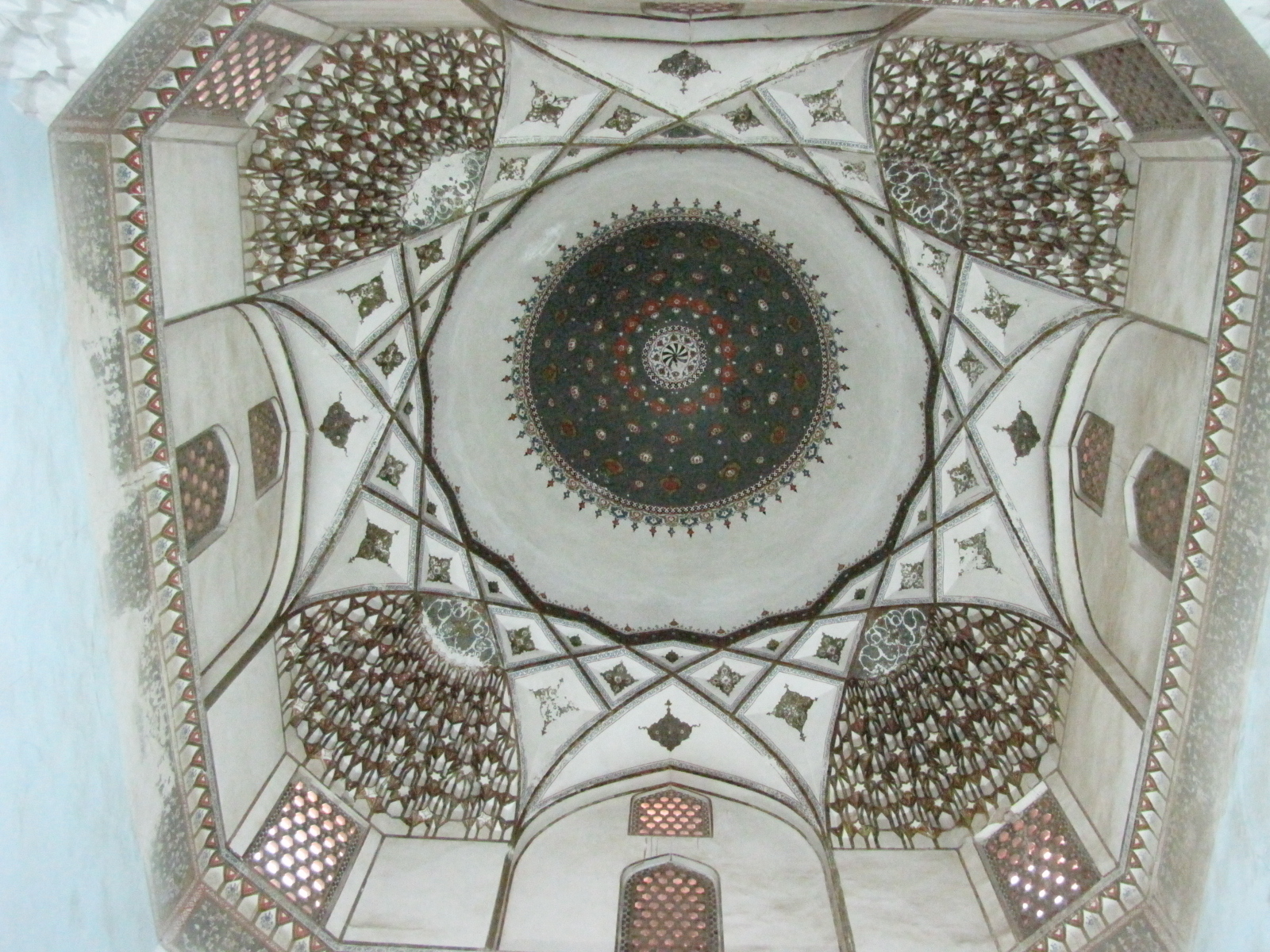
Inside Kausar Ali Shah's mausoleum, some plasterwork underneath the dome

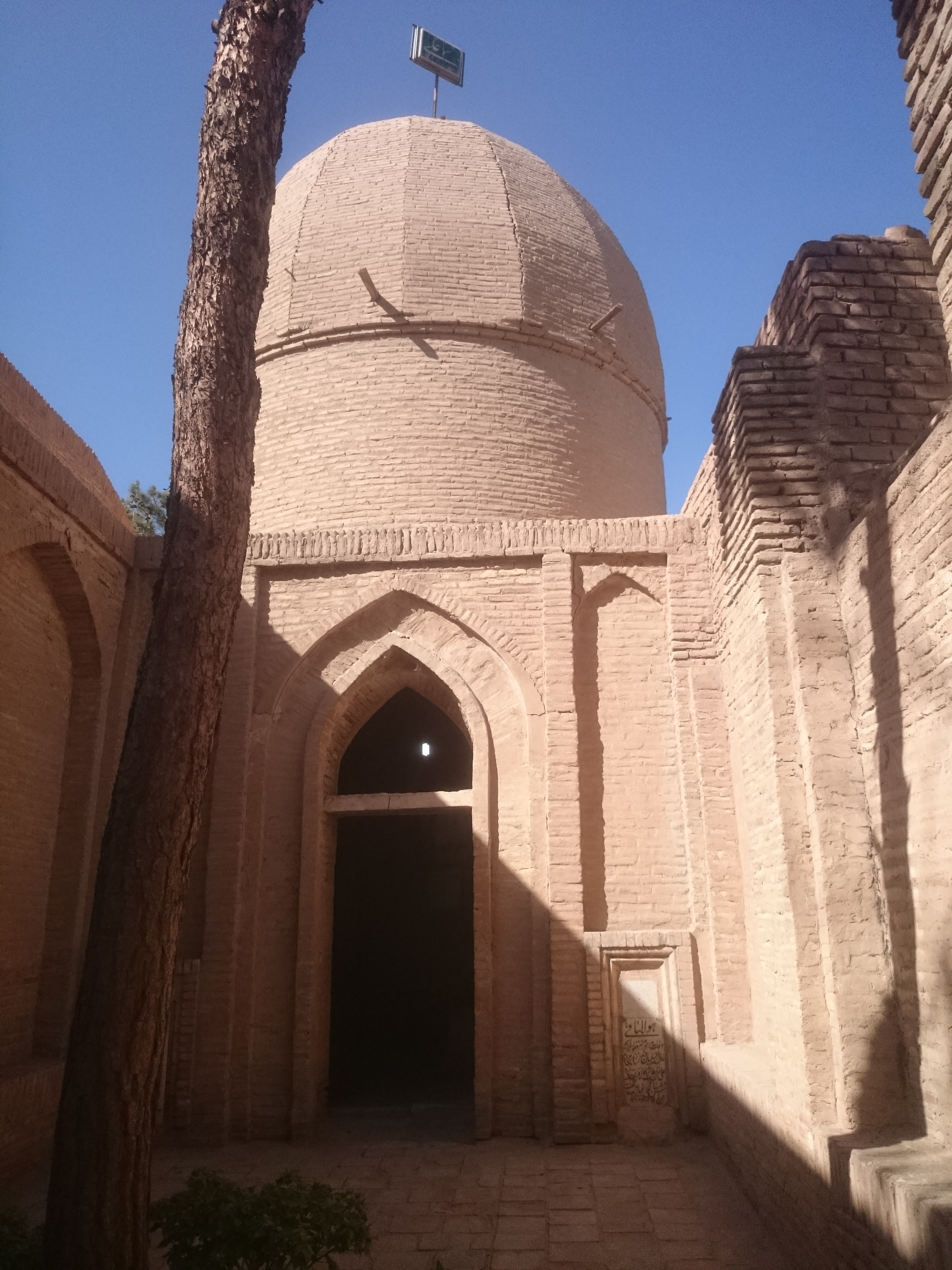
A view of the tomb of Shaykh Herat from within the complex

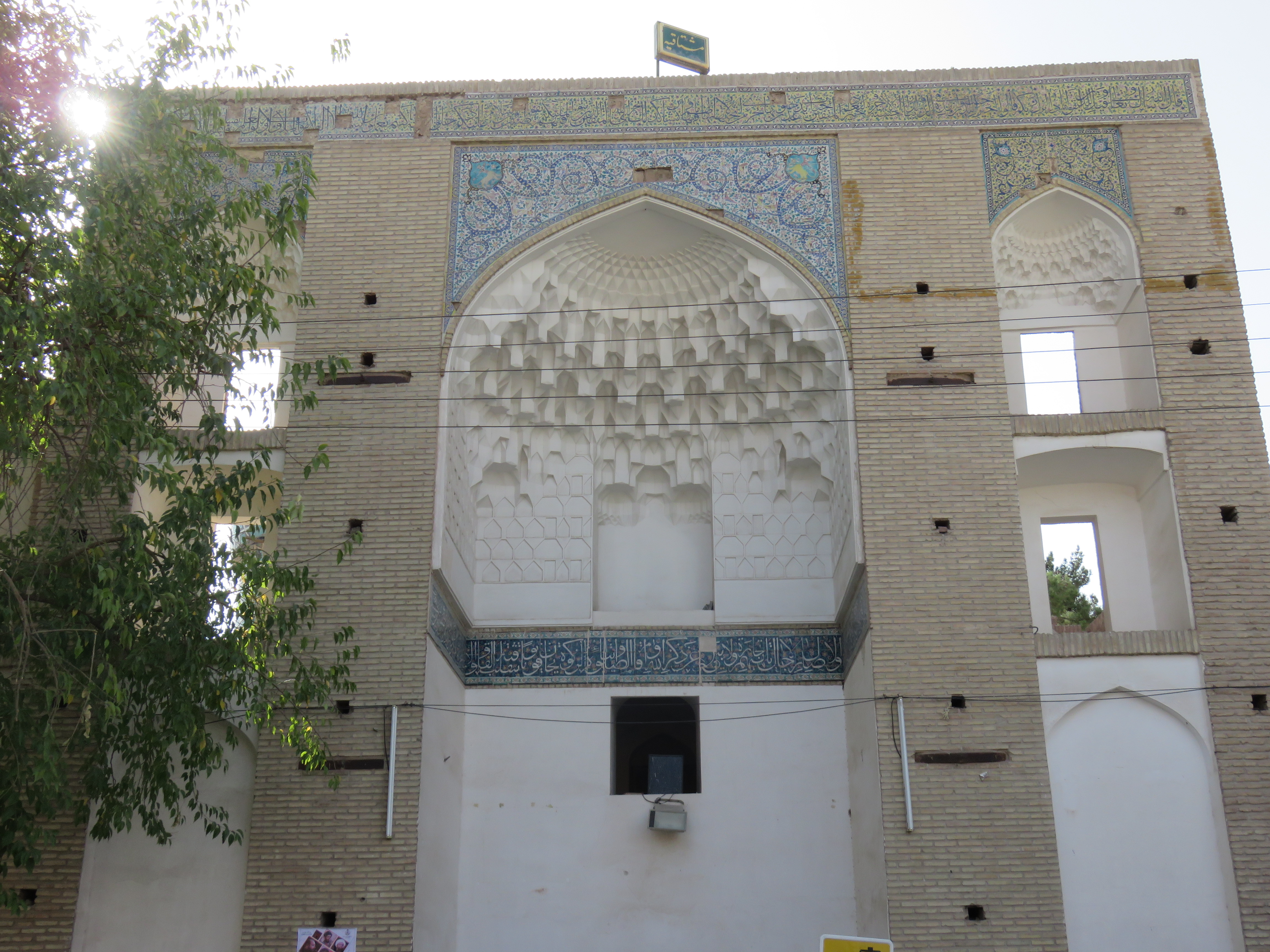
A view of the upper part of the main entrance, showing muqarnas work present

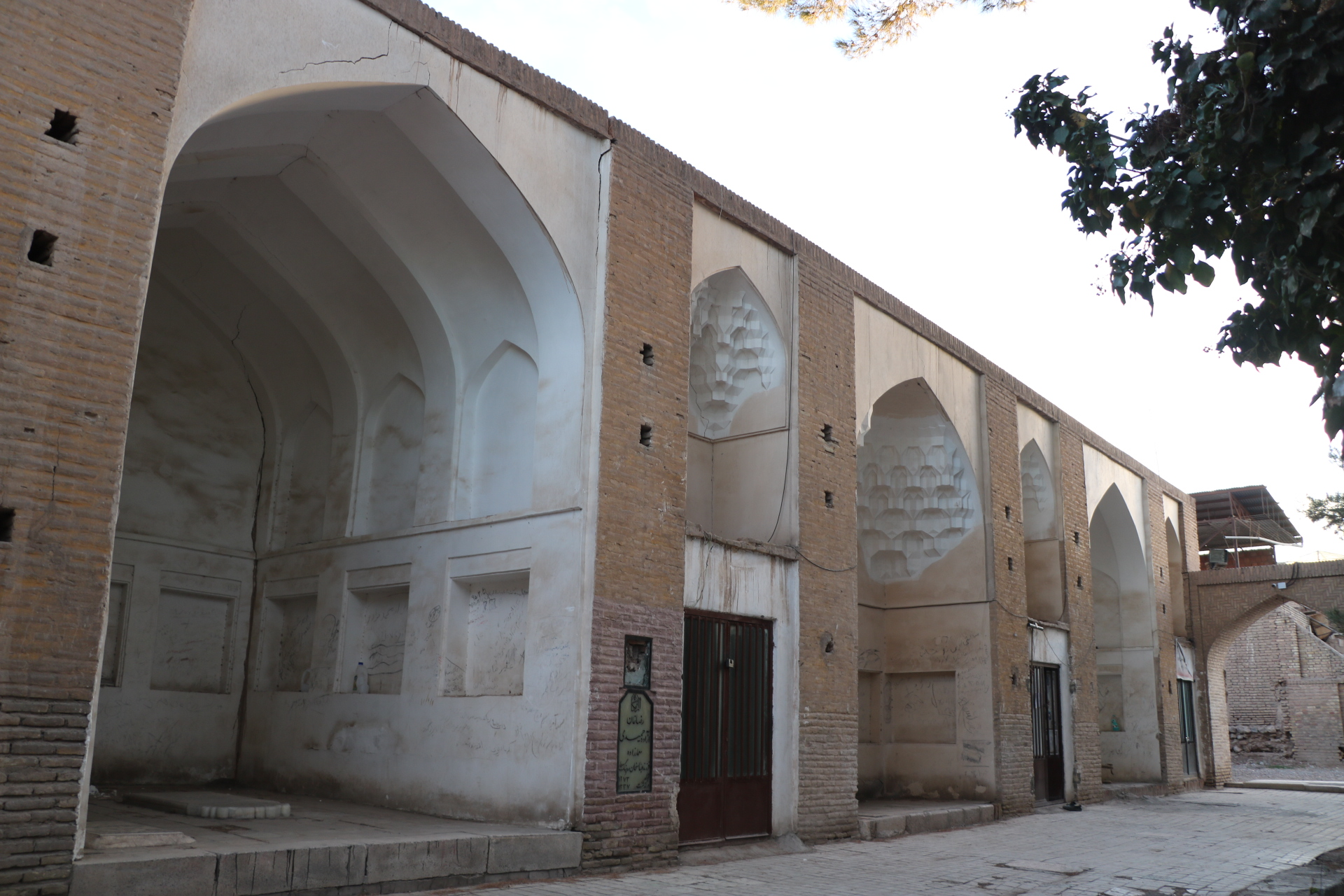
One of the entrances, leading into the complex

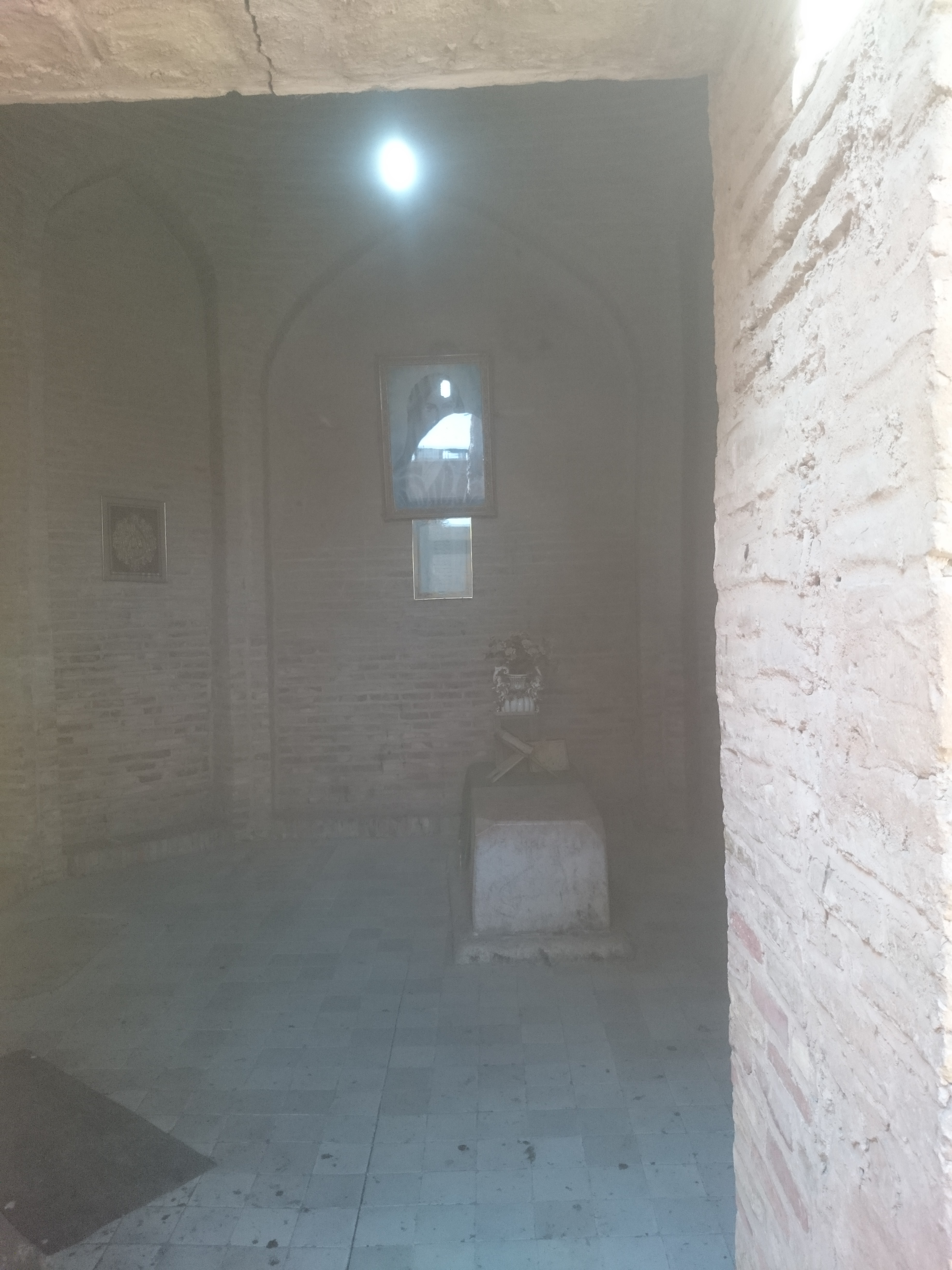
Inside Shaykh Herati's Tomb

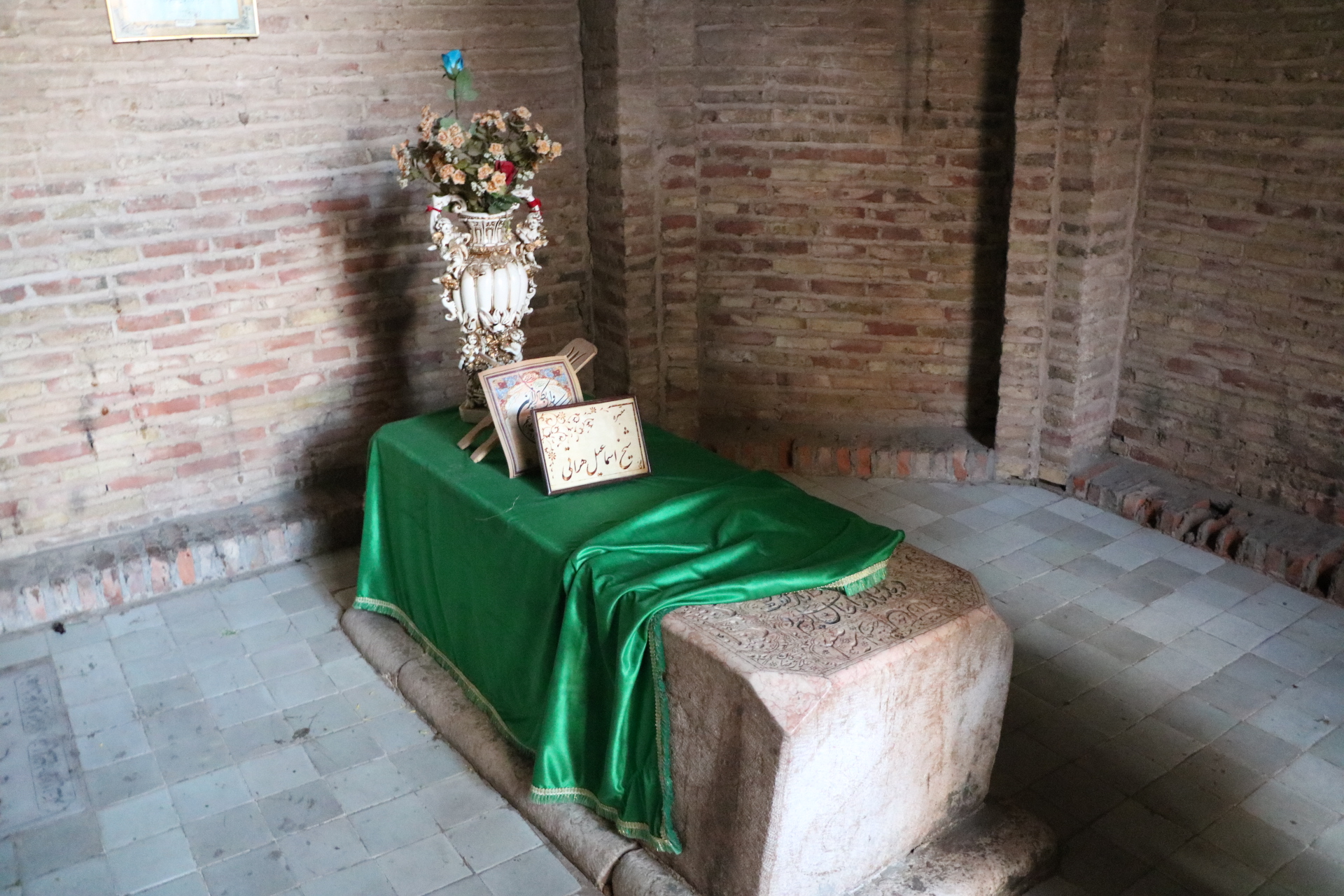
Grave of Shaykh Herati

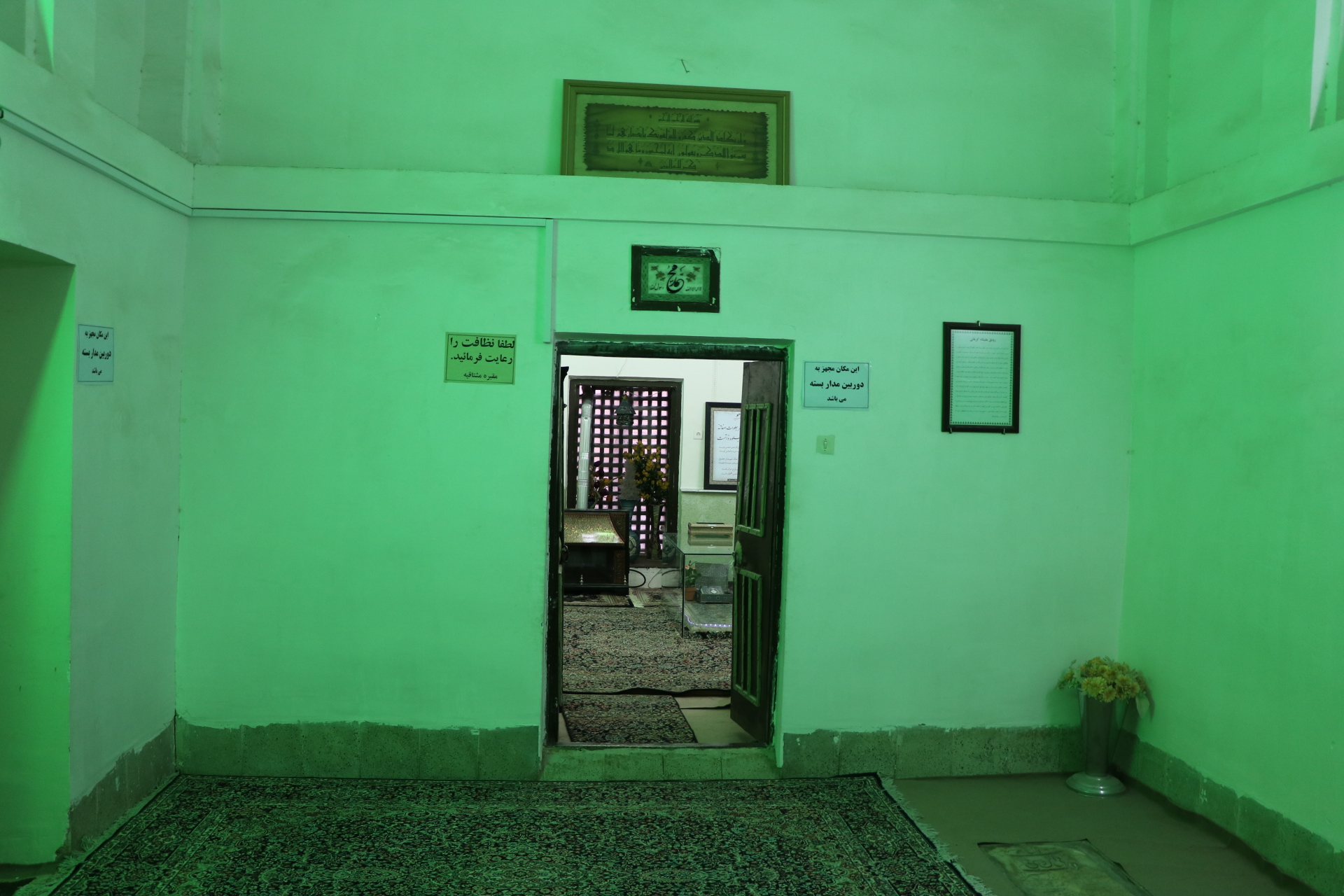
Interior of Mushtaq Ali Shah's mausoleum

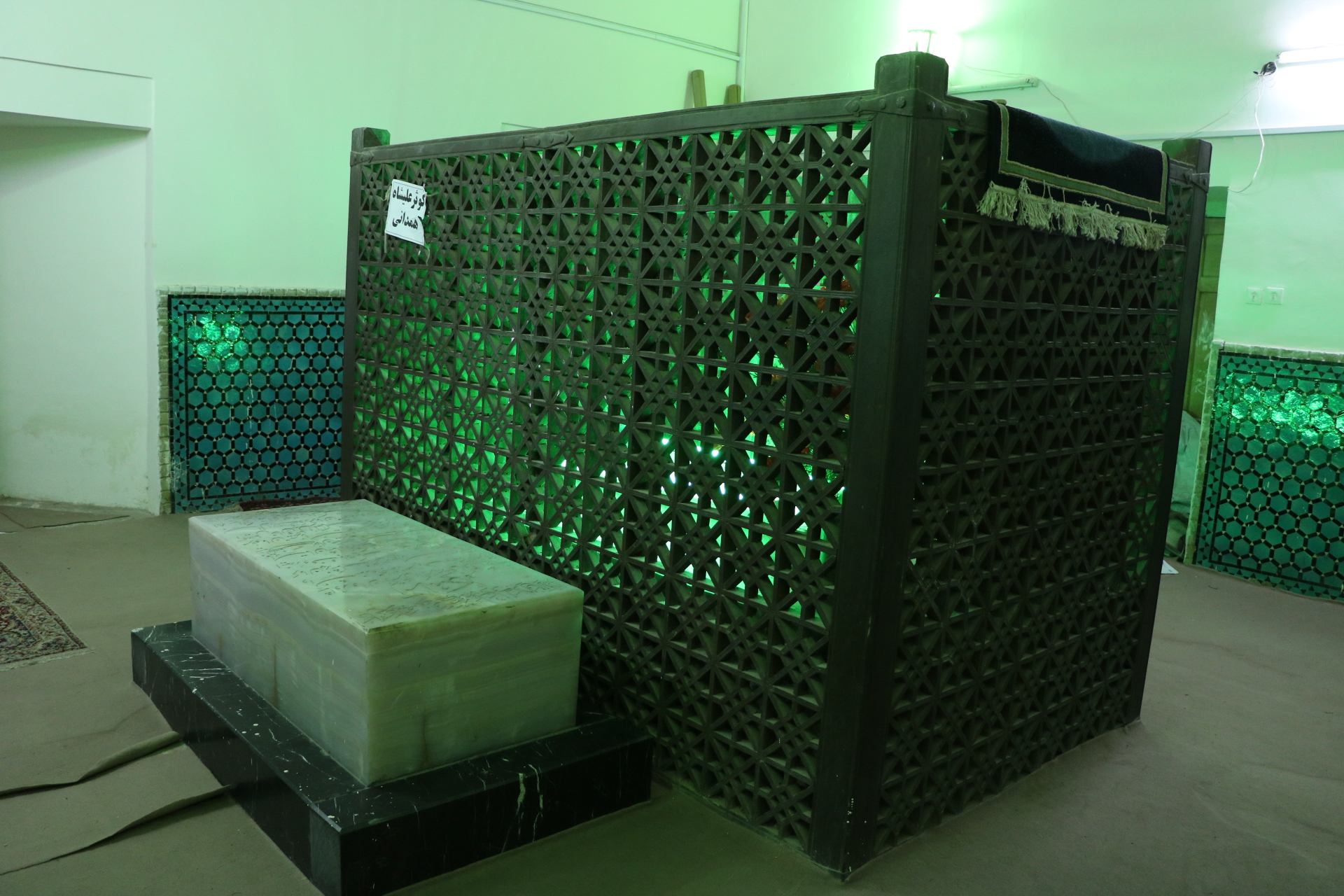
Wooden zarih enclosing the grave of Mushtaq Ali Shah

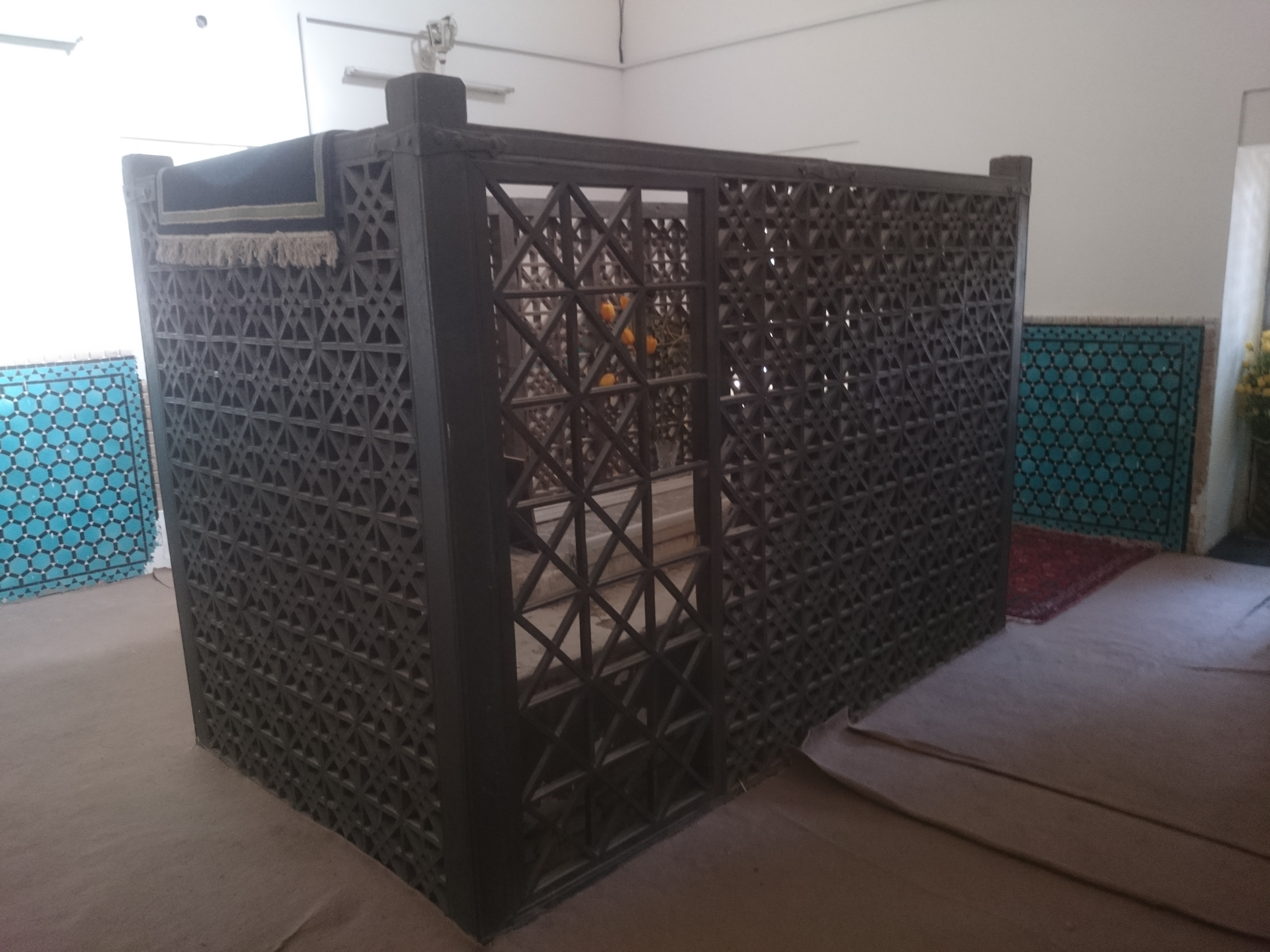
Another wooden zarih, this time enclosing the tomb of Kausar Ali Shah

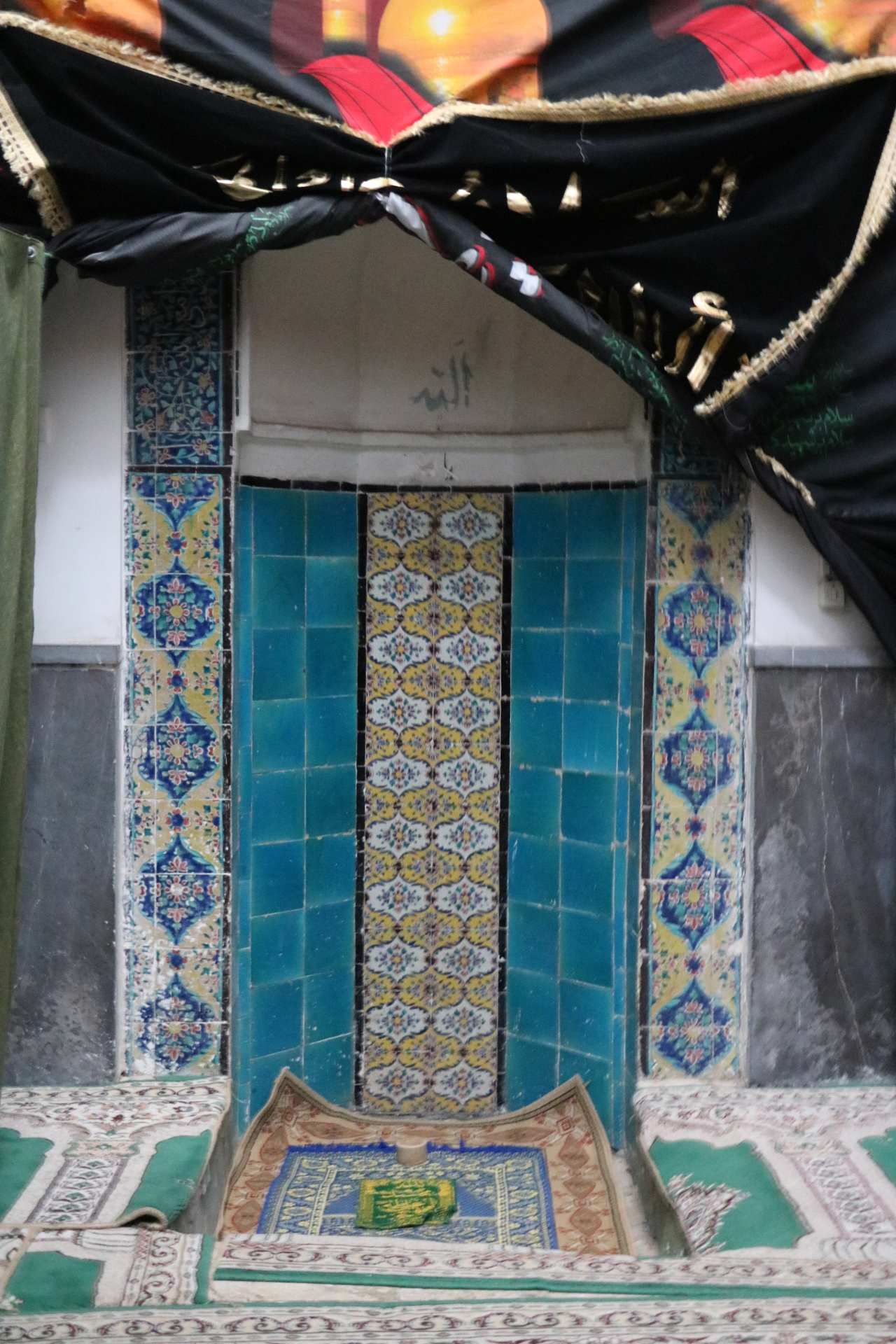
The mihrab of the attached mosque

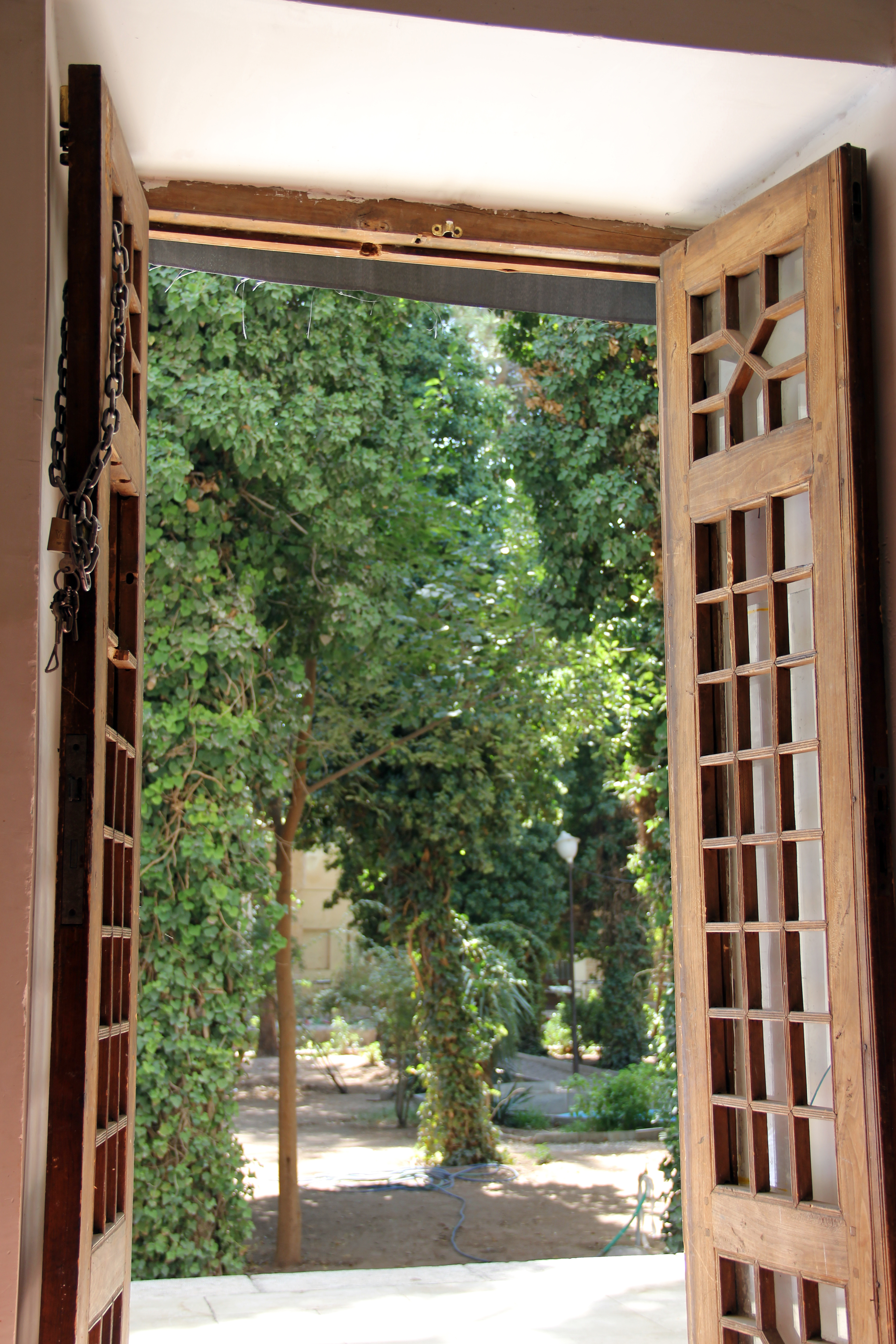
Doors

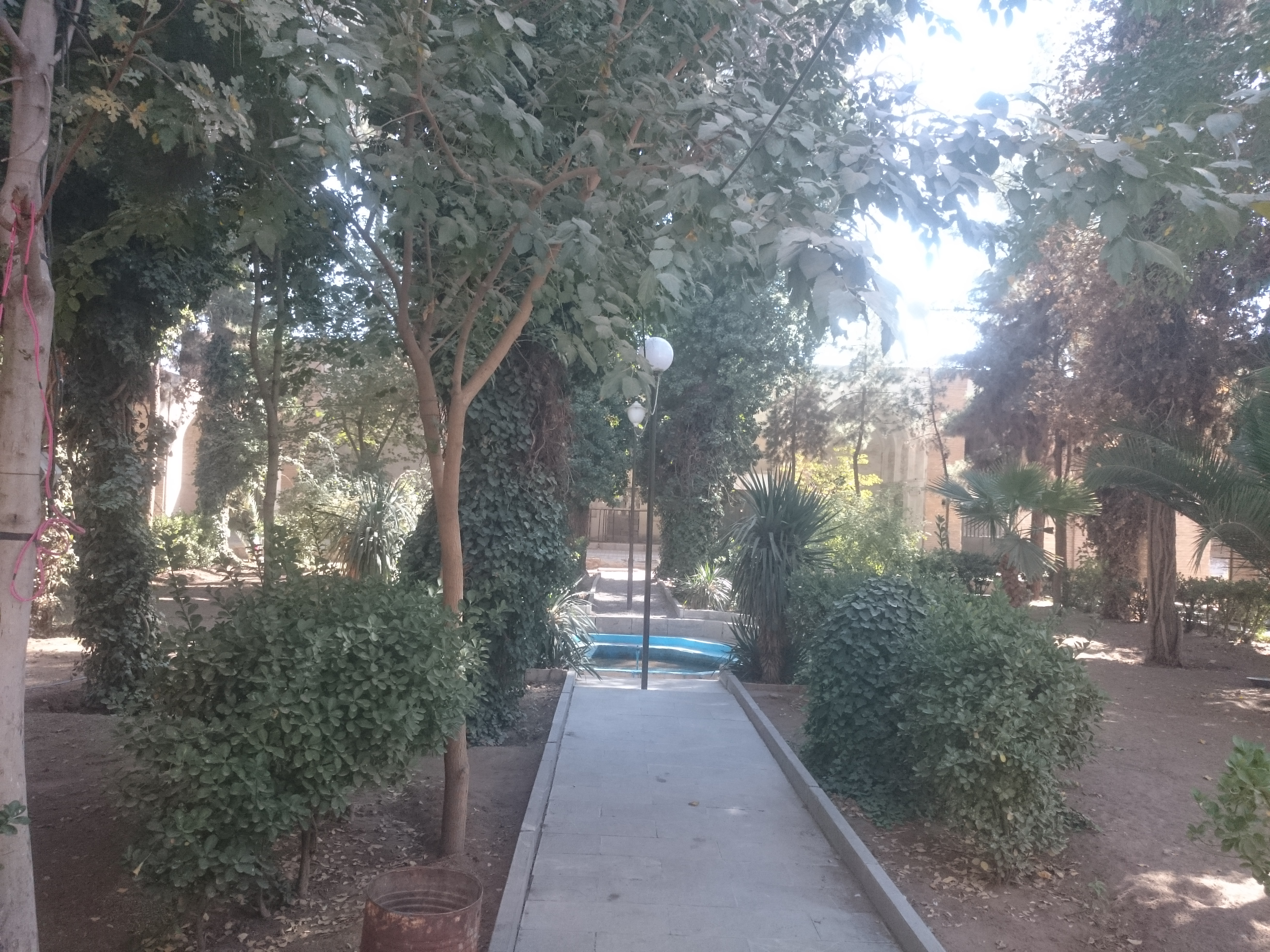
The garden of the memorial complex

== See also ==
- List of mausoleums in Iran
- Shia Islam in Iran
