= Mushtaq Ali Shah =

Iranian Sufi mystic and musician

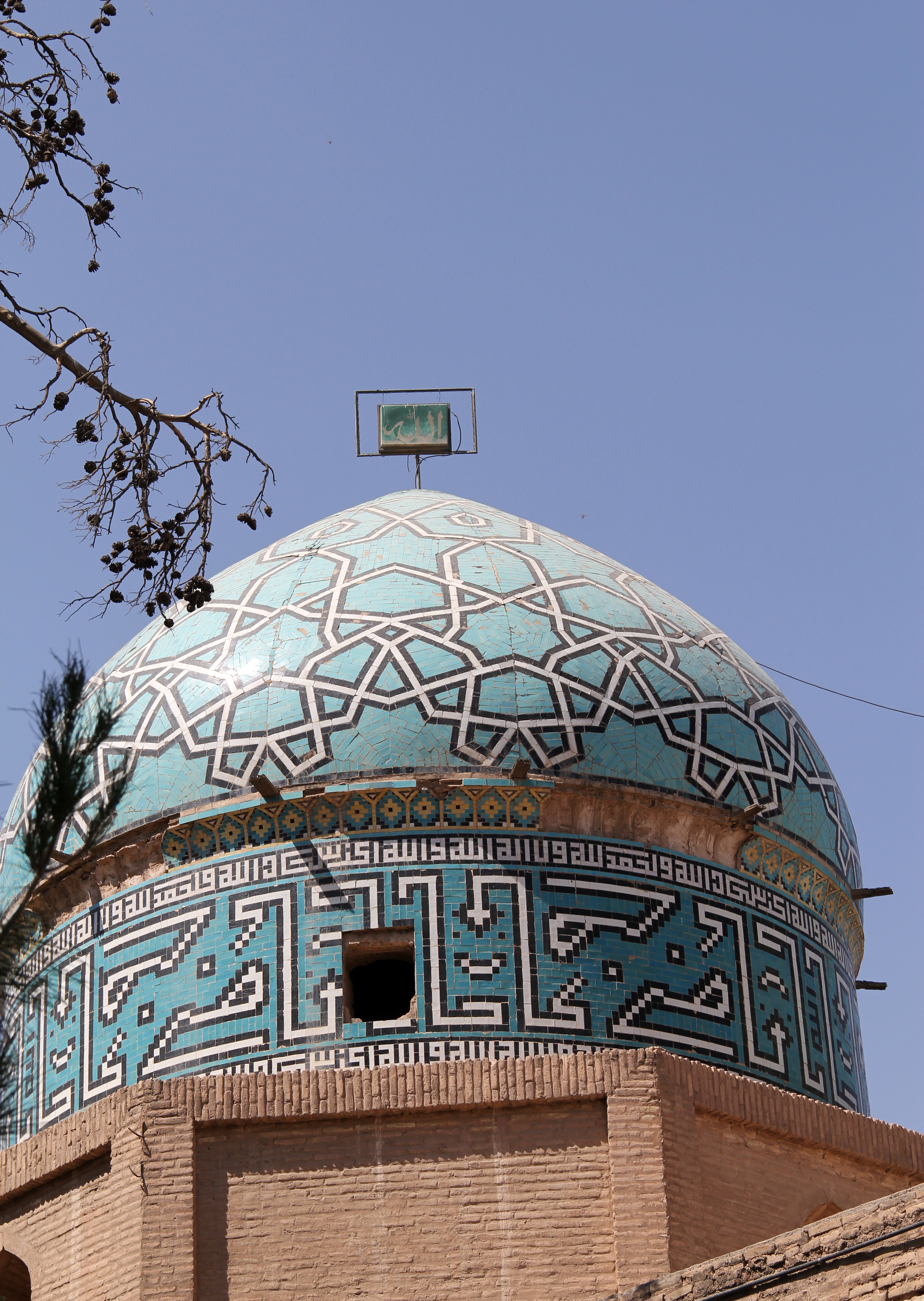
Dome of Mushtaqieh, Kerman, Iran, where Mushtaq Ali Shah is buried.

Mirza Mohammad Torbati (Persian: میرزا محمد تربتی), better known as Mushtaq Ali Shah (مشتاق علی شاه), his Sufi sobriquet, was an Iranian Ni'matullāhī mystic and musician who was executed in 1792 for playing his instrument, the setar, a previously three stringed lute whose fourth string was reportedly added by him and called Mushtaq in his honor.

== Biography ==
Shah was a member of the Nimatullahi Order of Sufis, and a majdhoub, who attracted Ismailis and others when he sang and played his setar.

Majdhoubs were described as “spiritual men whose mental faculties are, as it were, overwhelmed or disoriented by the force of divine attraction,” and were believed to enter a state of “divine intoxication” during their actions or rituals.

Shah disregarded the social conventions of his day. He was accused of "singing and playing the call to prayer at the Jum'ah Masjid on 27th Ramadan (19 May) 1792, and was stoned to death.

In another account, he was accused of "reciting the Qur'an with the sound of a setar" by Mullah Mohammad Taqi (ملا محمد تقی), a mujtahid."

== Music ==
In addition to his historical role as a martyr, Mushtaq Ali Shah is remembered for his association with the setar. The setar had three strings until the 19th century when it became customary to add a fourth string. Shah is credited with having added a fourth string to his instrument before his death in 1791.

== Memorial ==
He is buried in the Mushtaqieh Square of Kerman, known as the Mushtaqieh Dome (The Dome of Desire) or the Three Domes.

== See also ==
- Mushtaqieh Dome
