= Morteza Neidavoud =

Morteza Neydavoud مرتضى نى داوود
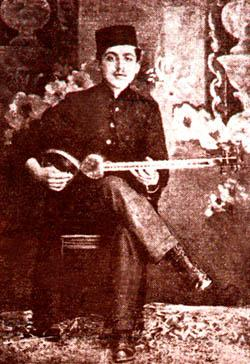

Background information
- Born: 1900; Isfahan, Sublime State of Iran
- Died: 1990 (aged 89–90) San Francisco, United States

Morteza Neydavoud (Persian: مرتضی نی‌داوود; 1900–1990) was a prominent master of Persian classical music and a tar soloist. His 1927 song Morq-e sahar (Dawn bird) is one of the most famous Persian songs and has been performed by various singers.

== Early life and education ==
Morteza Neydavoud was born in Isfahan to a Persian Jewish musical family. He was 3 when the family moved to Tehran. His musical talent became apparent in childhood. His father Bala Khan, who was a musician himself and played the tonbak, wanted to see his son enroll into a different field, and was thus initially against him becoming a musician. However, realizing his natural talent and determination, he eventually took him to see Ramazan Zolfaghari, a musician who was a student of Aqa Hossein-Qoli.

Neydavoud was trained by Zolfaghari for a short while and then he went to Aqa Hossein-Qoli to learn from the master musician himself. Neydavoud learnt with Hossein-Qoli until the latter's death in 1916. He then went on to learn music from Darvish Khan who was a famous student of Mirza Hossein-Qoli. During this time he picked up on playing radif and then the tar. At the end of three years he received the symbolic Golden Battle-Axe, awarded to outstanding students.

== Career ==
In early 1925, he founded a class to teach the Persian tar and radif. He named the school Darvish in honour of his master, who had died in 1926.

His acquaintance with the iconic singer Qamar-ol-Moluk Vaziri at a private celebration led to the discovery of one of the greatest Iranian singing talents. The two continued to co-operate and as Qamar learned from him, she performed many of her famous songs. From 1927 onward, most of Qamar's lyrics and songs were accompanied by Morteza Neydavoud.

Following the establishment of the radio, Neydavoud worked with the broadcasters just like other artists did, some being Reza Mahjoubi, Ali Akbar Shahnazi, Habib Samayi, Abolhassan Saba and Musa Maroufi. He either wrote lyrics or composed for famous singers such as Qamar-ol-Moluk Vaziri, Moluk Zarrabi, Ruhangiz, Adib Khansari, Javad Badi Zadeh and Gholam Hossein Banan.

== Notable works ==
- Performing the entire repertoire of Persian classical music (radif)
- Vocal pieces: Morq-e Sahar (Text: Malek-o-Shoara Bahar), Atash-e del
- Instrumental pieces: Pishdaramad-e Esfahan

== Sources ==
- Dehkordi, Morteżā Ḥoseyni (2005). "NEY-DĀWUD, Morteżā". Encyclopaedia Iranica.
