= Nur-Ali Borumand =

Iranian musician and composer (born 1971)

Nour-Ali Boroumand
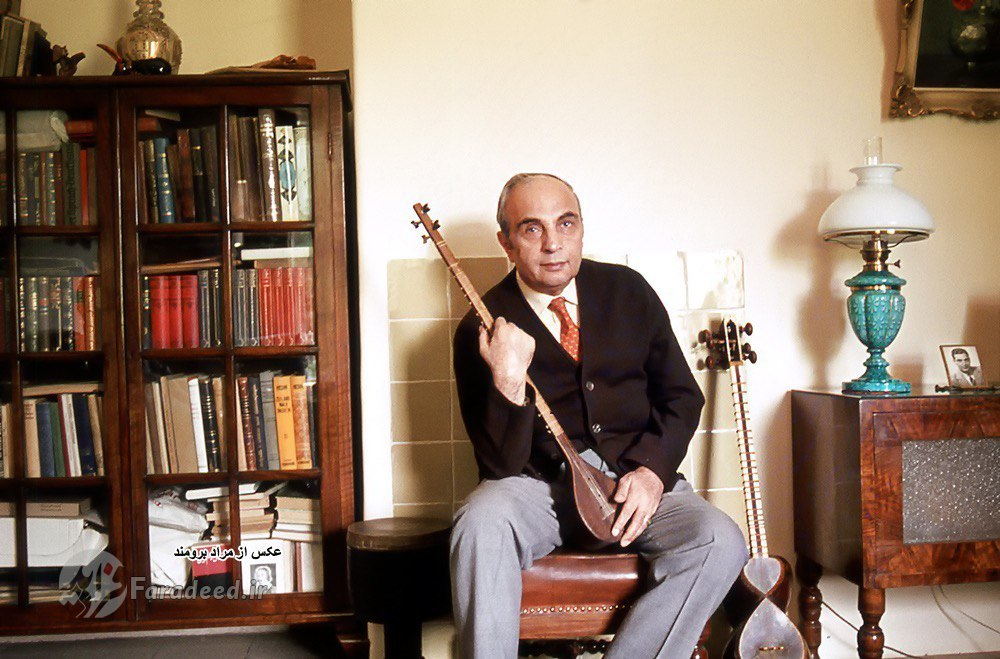
- Born: 1906; Tehran, Imperial Iran
- Died: 20 January 1977 (aged 70–71); Tehran, Iran
- Resting place: Zahir od-Dowleh
- Musical career
- Genre: Persian traditional music
- Labels: tar, setar, Santur, Tonbak

Nour-Ali Boroumand (1906 – January 20, 1977) was an Iranian musician, performer of the tar, setar, santur, and tombak, and an expert in Persian vocal music.

== Biography ==
Nour-Ali Boroumand was born in Tehran in 1906. From the age of seven, he demonstrated a natural talent for music by playing the tombak without having received formal instruction from any teacher. His father, Mirza Abdolvahhab Khan Boroumand Javaheri, originally from Isfahan, was a renowned jeweler and gem expert who was devoted to two passions: music and flowers. The garden of his home served as a gathering place for artists and hosted prominent musicians such as Darvish Khan, Sama Hozour, Hossein Khan Esma'ilzadeh, and Seyyed Hossein Taherzadeh. Among his sons, Nour-Ali developed a strong interest in music, while Mahmoud-Ali devoted himself to horticulture and the cultivation of flowers.

At the age of thirteen, Boroumand began studying the tar under Darvish Khan and completed Darvish Khan's introductory radif repertoire within three years. He developed a close friendship with Abolhasan Saba; their friendship began when both were studying the tar and setar under Darvish Khan, who affectionately referred to them as the “two little ones.”

At the age of eighteen, Boroumand traveled to Berlin to continue his education. He took with him a setar, which he called Roshanak, so that he could continue practicing music during his stay abroad. While living with the family of a physician in Berlin and completing his secondary education, he regularly attended concerts and gradually developed an interest in Western classical music, learning to play the piano as well.

After returning to Iran at the age of twenty-two, he continued studying musical notation and the Persian radif under Musa Ma'rufi. A year later, he returned to Germany to pursue medical studies. After six years, he developed a serious eye condition and traveled to Switzerland for treatment. He subsequently returned to Iran in 1935 and spent the remainder of his life in Tehran, in the Amiriyyeh district. The eye condition ultimately left him blind, and he remained so for the rest of his life.

From the late 1930s until the 1950s, Boroumand devoted himself primarily to the study and teaching of music. Owing to his proficiency in German, he also worked part-time as an instructor in schools and colleges.

At the invitation of the American ethnomusicologist Bruno Nettl, Boroumand traveled to Illinois, where he spent approximately one month introducing the Iranian dastgāh tradition. During his stay, he recorded portions of the Persian radif repertoire, recordings that are now preserved in the archives of the University of Illinois. In 2016, these recordings were made available in Iran to Mohsen Mohseni through Bruno Nettl from the University of Illinois archives.

Boroumand continued his training on the tar, setar, and santur, while furthering his study of the Persian radif under the guidance of Habib Samaei, Musa Ma'rufi, and Esma'il Ghahremani.

== Teaching career ==
In 1965, coinciding with the establishment of the music program at the Faculty of Fine Arts of the University of Tehran, Boroumand was invited by Mehdi Barkeshli to join the faculty as an instructor of the radif. He subsequently began teaching Iranian classical music in an academic setting. There, he taught the radif orally to students twice a week until his retirement in 1974.

In the mid-1970s, following the establishment of the Center for the Preservation and Propagation of Iranian Music, he also began teaching at that institution. Several audio recordings of his classes have survived, including sessions in the Māhur mode featuring instruction given to Nour al-Din Razavi Servestani. In these recordings, Boroumand performs the complete radif repertoire on the setar and provides explanations regarding its performance and vocal interpretation.

== Students ==
Boroumand trained many musicians and vocalists of Iranian classical music, including Akbar Golpayegani (Golpa), Nasrollah Nassirpour, Mohammad-Reza Shajarian, Parisa, Parviz Meshkatian, Hossein Alizadeh, Foroud Garginpour, Mohammad-Reza Lotfi, Farrokh Mazhari, Dariush Tala'i, Majid Kiani, Jalal Zolfonun, Shahram Nazeri, Nasser Farhangfar, Masoud Shenasa, Razavi Servestani, Kamal Same'i, Ali-Akbar Shekarchi, and Mehdi Azarsina.

== Works and Legacy ==
Boroumand recorded the Radif of Mirza Abdollah, based on the version transmitted by Esma'il Ghahremani, on two separate occasions. His vocal radif repertoire was likewise based on the tradition transmitted by Seyyed Hossein Taherzadeh.

His performance style on the tar and setar was rooted in the school of Darvish Khan, while his santur playing reflected the older santur tradition associated with Habib Samā'i.

The book Radif-e Sāzi-ye Musiqi-ye Sonnati-ye Iran ("Instrumental Radif of Traditional Iranian Music"), containing the Radif of Mirza Abdollah as transmitted by Boroumand, was transcribed by Jean During and published in Persian translation by Pirouz Sayyar in 1991 by Soroush Publications.

== Death ==
Boroumand died on 20 January 1977 (30 Dey 1355) and was buried in the Zahir od-Dowleh Cemetery in Tehran.
