= 1900 in Iran =

- Decades
- See also: Other events of 1900; Years in Iran

The following lists events that happened during 1900 in Qajar era.

== Incumbents ==
- Monarch: Mozaffar ad-Din Shah Qajar

== Events ==
- Iran at the 1900 Summer Olympics.

== Births ==
- February 16 – Nasrollah Entezam, Iranian diplomat.
- March 6 – Morteza Neidavoud, Iranian musician.
- May 17 – Ruhollah Khomeini, Supreme Leader of Iran from 1979 to 1989.
- ? – Fakhr-Ozma Arghun, Iranian teacher, journalist and poet.
- ? – Grigor Vahramian Gasparbeg, Iranian painter.
- ? – Morteza Mahjubi, Iranian pianist and composer.
- ? – Salamullah Javid, Iranian politician and physician.
- ? – Satenik Aghababian, Iranian actress, opera singer.
- ? – Shamseddin Amir-Alai, Iranian politician.
- ? – Ustad Ali Maryam, Iranian architect.

== Deaths ==
- ? – Hasan-Ali Khan Amir Nezam Garrusi, Iranian diplomat, politician, calligrapher and writer.
- ? – Mirza Mohammad-Ali Sanglakh, Iranian calligrapher.
