= 1905 in Iran =

- Decades
- See also: Other events of 1905; Years in Iran

The following lists events that happened during 1905 in Qajar era.

== Incumbents ==
- Monarch: Mozaffar ad-Din Shah Qajar

== Events ==
- Constitutionalization attempts in Iran.

== Births ==
- February 25 – Yadollah Sahabi, Iranian politician.
- April 29 – ʻAlí-Akbar Furútan, Iranian historian.
- July 12 – Abdolhossein Noushin, Iranian playwright and film director.
- September 11 – Karim Sanjabi, Persian jurist and politician and founder of the National Front.
- October 9 – Mahmoud Mirza, Heir Presumptive Qajar dynasty.
- December 3 – Gholam Hossein Sadighi, Iranian politician.
- December 12 – Ali Amini, Prime Minister of Iran from 6 May 1961 to 19 July 1962.
- ? – Abdollah Riazi, Persian politician.
- ? – Ali-Asghar Bahari, Iranian musician and kamancheh player.
- ? – Ardeshir Ovanessian, Iranian-Armenian politician.
- ? – Esmat Dowlatshahi, Iranian royal and one of the wives of Reza Shah.
- ? – Habib Samaei, Iranian musical artist, santur player.
- ? – Helen Jeffreys Bakhtiar, American nurse.
- ? – Jahanshah Saleh, Iranian physician, politician and writer.
- ? – Nur-Ali Borumand, Iranian historian and musician of Persian Classical music.
- ? – Qamar-ol-Moluk Vaziri, Iranian singer.
- ? – Reza Radmanesh, Iranian politician and physicist.
- ? – Sadegh Amirazizi, Iranian army general and politician.

== Deaths ==
- August 18 – Joseph Cochran, American missionary.
- August 31 – Ismat al-Doulah, Persian royal.
- ? – Martiros Khan Davidkhanian, Iranian general and philanthropist.
- ? – Mohammad Hasan Mamaqani, leading mujtahid of Najaf in the 19th century.
- ? – Sattur Khan Setkhanian, Iranian general.
- ? – Yahya Ghaffari, Iranian painter.
