= Moluk Zarabi =

Iranian singer (1907–2000)

Moluk Zarabi ملوک ضرابی
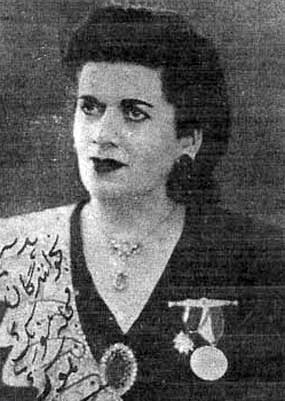

Background information
- Birth name: Moluk Farshforosh Kashani
- Born: 22 March 1907; Kashan, Qajar Iran (now Iran)
- Died: 5 January 2000 (aged 92); Tehran, Iran
- Genres: Persian traditional music
- Occupation(s): Singer, actress
- Years active: 1920–1978

Moluk Farshforosh Kashani (Persian: ملوک ضرابی, Moluk Żarrābi; 22 March 1907 Kashan – 5 January 2000 Tehran), known as Moluk Zarabi, was an Iranian singer of Persian traditional music and actor.

== Life ==
Moluk Farsh Kashani was born in a music-loving family. Her grandfather Haji Jafar was a singer in the court of Naser al-Din Shah Qajar. She inherited a good voice from her father and grandfather and showed talent at the age of seven. Her early interest in singing caused her family's displeasure and social exclusion at school. Nonetheless, Zarabi began singing in various Kashan groups at 13.

Hossein Taherzadeh discovered Zarabi's singing talent at the age of 9 and taught her to sing for two years. Haji Khan Ain al-Dowleh (drums) also taught her to play percussion instruments for a year. Zarabi's alto voice was very suitable for singing percussive ballads. Later, she became so famous by singing percussion ballads that they gave her the stage name "Zarrabi". Zarabi learned singing from Abul Hasan Iqbal Azar and was one of his students.

== Professional experience ==
Zarrabi's career as a singer began in 1924 with two public performances at Firooz Bahram High School in Tehran and another performance with Ahmad Ebadi at Tehran's Grand Hotel.

Later, she joined Ismail Mehrtash's theater group called Anjuman Barbad, which was founded in 1926, and performed with this leading orchestra in plays such as Adalat and musical plays and pieces such as Khosrow and Shirin and Layla and Majnun and established her position among the leading singers and actors of Iranian theater and cinema in the first half of the 20th century.

Shortly after the establishment of Radio Tehran in 1940, Zarrabi was invited along with several different groups. In these radio programs, he collaborated with musicians such as Abolhasan Saba, Hossein Yahaghi, Morteza Mahjubi, Habib Samaei and Hossein Tehrani. The first radio performance of Zarrabi was the ballad "Kisti", whose lyrics were written by Hassan Salek and whose music was composed by Hossein Yahaghi.

Around 1957, Zarrabi was chosen as an honorary member of Tehran Radio Orchestra No. 7 (special orchestra) which operated under the supervision of Abdullah Jahanpanah.

Zarrabi traveled to Syria and Lebanon in 1938 to record songs with Ismail Mehrtash, Abolhasan Saba, Hossein Qoli Tatai and singers Javad Badiazadeh, Taj Esfahani, Melke Broumand and Adib Khansari. The pieces recorded by Meluk Zarrabi were "Eshg Man" for Odeon and the operettas "Khosro and Shirin" and "Khodstaei Shirin" which were performed with the Barbad community orchestra.

Among Moluk Zarrabi's famous ballads are "Sargasht Deladar and Gham Hejran", "Bride's Flower from the Wind of Saba", "Daughters of Cyrus", "You went and broke your promise", "O Shukh, O Negara". And "flower season".

At the age of 25, Zarrabi sang the song "Flower Bride" in Tehran theater on the occasion of the Kashf-e hijab, and because of this, she was beaten by religious fanatics, but she continued her work with a stronger will. She performed many times at Mohammad Reza Pahlavi's birthday party.

== Death ==
Zarrabi died on 5 January 2000, in her private apartment in Tehran, and was buried in Behesht-e Zahra, plot 48, row 67, number 34.

== Albumology ==
- Rana's album on YouTube (Faramarz Asif later performed a song with the same name inspired by Rana's song)
- Sokhni ba del album
- Whose album?
- The best album 1
- The best album 2
