= Farahani =

Farahani (Persian: فراهانی), also written as Farahany, is a common family name in Iran. It refers to someone from the region of Farahan. Notable people with the surname include:

== Politicians ==
- Ahmad Amirabadi Farahani, member of the Iranian parliament for Qom during 2012–2016 and 2016–2020
- Mirza Taghi Khan Farahani (Persian: میرزا تقی‌خان فراهانی) also known as Amir Kabir (Persian: امیرکبیر)
- Ghaem Magham Farahani
- Mohsen Safaei Farahani
- Roozbeh Farahanipour

== Musicians ==
- Agha Ali Akbar Farahani, musician
- Agha Mirza Abdollah Farahani, musician
- Agha Mirza Hossein Gholi Farahani, musician

== Actors ==
- Behzad Farahani
- Shaghayegh Farahani
- Golshifteh Farahani

== Film makers ==
- Ramin Farahani
- Mitra Farahani

== See also ==
- Farhani, list of people with a similar surname
