= 1878 in Iran =

- Decades
- See also: Other events of 1878; Years in Iran

The following lists events that happened during 1878 in Qajar era.

== Incumbents ==
- Monarch: Naser al-Din Shah Qajar

== Births ==
- March 15 – Reza Shah, Shah of Iran from 1925 to 1941 and founder of the Pahlavi Dynasty.
- December 26 – Muhammad Hossein Gharavi, Iraqi-Iranian faqih and poet.
- ? – Aqa Najafi Quchani, Shia Muslim scholar of 14th century AH.
- ? – Aziz al-Soltan, Iranian royal page.
- ? – Fathollah Khan Akbar, Prime Minister of Iran.
- ? – Hassan Taqizadeh, Iranian diplomat and politician.
- ? – Hossein Hang Afarin, Iranian musician.
- ? – Mohammad Ali Modarres Khiabani, Iranian author, mojtahed and scholar.
- ? – Tuba Azmudeh, Iranian educator.
