= Ahmad Ebadi =

Iranian musician

Ahmad Ebādi
- احمد عبادی
- Born: Ahmad Ebādi احمد عبادی; 1906; Tehran, Iran
- Died: 14 March 1993 (aged 87); Tehran, Iran
- Occupations: Musician, player of Setār
- Parent: Mirza Abdollah

Ahmad Ebādi (Persian: احمد عبادی; 1906–1993) was an Iranian musician and setar player. Born in Tehran, he was a member of the most extraordinary family of Iranian music. Ahmad's father, Mirza Abdollah, is arguably the most influential figure in Persian traditional music, and his paternal uncle, Mirza Hossein-Qoli, is also well known for his mastery in playing the tar. Ahmad's paternal grandfather, Ali-Akbar Farahani, was also a talented musician.

Ahmad started learning music at an early age. At the age of seven, he was able to play tombak to accompany his father. He lost his father soon thereafter, but continued his education with his sisters, especially Moloud Khanom. He became one of the best setar players of all time. For years he played on Iranian radio especially in a program called Golha, produced by Davood Pirnia. Ebadi had a unique style in playing the setar. He also invented a variety of different tunings for setar.

He died in 1993 and is buried in Emamzadeh Taher Cemetery in Karaj.

Ahmad Ebadi and Moluk Zarabi performed in 1924 at Tehran's Grand Hotel.
