= Taj Esfahani =

Iranian singer

- Born: Jalal al-Din Taj Esfahani; 1903; Isfahan, Iran
- Died: 4 December 1981 (aged 78) Isfahan, Iran
- Genres: Persian traditional music
- Occupation: Singer
- Years active: 1940-1981

Jalal al-Din Taj Esfahani (1903 - 4 December 1981), known as Taj Esfahani, was an Iranian singer of Persian traditional music. He was associated with the Isfahan school of singing and is regarded as one of the prominent singers of Iranian vocal music. His best-known works include "Atash-e Del" and "Be Esfahan Ro".

== Early life and training ==
Taj Esfahani was born in Isfahan in 1903. His father, Sheikh Vaez Esfahani, known as Taj al-Vaezin, was familiar with the modes of Persian traditional music. Taj began learning singing at a young age from his father and later studied with several teachers, including Seyed Abdolrahim Esfahani and Nayeb Asadollah.

== Career ==
In the early 1920s, Taj Esfahani moved from Isfahan to Tehran, where he became known in artistic circles. He performed with musicians including Ali-Akbar Shahnazi, Morteza Mahjubi and Morteza Neydavoud, and his voice was recorded on gramophone records.

Taj Esfahani was among the early singers to work with Radio Tehran in the 1940s. From 1949, he also worked with Radio Isfahan, where he performed and supervised musicians.

== Legacy ==
Taj Esfahani is associated with the preservation of the Isfahan school of singing. IMNA described him as a prominent figure in Iranian vocal music and as a reviver of the Isfahan singing school. PANA described him as a rare figure of the Isfahan school of singing in a report on a commemorative music event in Isfahan.

His students included Mohammad-Reza Shajarian, Hossein Khajeh Amiri, Ali Asghar Shahzeidi, Alireza Eftekhari and Hamidreza Noorbakhsh.

In 2019, a collection of previously unpublished recordings by Taj Esfahani was released in Tehran. The collection included 177 minutes of vocal recordings and was presented as material useful for studying his singing style.
