= Mir-Ismael Sedghiasa Hosseini =

Musician

Mir-Ismael Sedghiasa Hosseini (میراسماعیل صدقی‌آسا حسینی) (1951–2018) also known as the “Minister of the Blinds” (Vaziri Nabinayan) was a musician and songwriter from Yazd, who started music from childhood and became famous in playing and composing music.

He was soon famous and popular for playing and composing music and became known among the blind artists as "The Minister of the Blinds (Vaziri Nabinayan).” He was suffering from cancer for many years and in the night of March 27, 2017, he died in Germany at the age of 67.

== Education ==
Mir-Ismael Sedghiasa Hosseini was born in Yazd. Even though he was blind and his family had an unfavorable financial condition, his parents took him to Tehran to continue his education. At the age of 6, he learned the violin from his teacher, Hossein Ali Vazirtabar. At the age of 28, he began his studies in law at the University of Tehran, but despite in having all legal units completed, he was unable to continue his studies and obtain a final dissertation because he refused to attend an ideological examination. Mir-Ismael spent the last 30 years of his life in Cologne, Germany teaching music.

== Activities ==
Mir-Ismael was dedicated in traditional music and, like Ali-Naqi Vaziri, he was very diligent in its evolution. He was interested in the indigenous folk music of various lands of Iran, and so he traveled to different cities and composed Kurdish and Luri songs with the help of his colleagues. In high school, he wrote his thesis on folkloric music. At the age of 24, he began cooperating and working with the renowned Shaida Group (A Persian traditional music group).

He was a music teacher at various schools in Tehran for over 15 years and taught blind students how to read music notes. His works are composed in the Album, “Sepideh Folk Songs” including the songs: “Iran a Saraye Omid” (Iran you're the hope), and the famous music composition: “Az khune javanan laleh damideh” (From the blood of the youths, the country is filled with tulips) written by the poet, Aref Qazvini.

In the last 30 years of his life in Germany, Mir-Ismael trained many students at Cologne Cultural Centers as a music teacher. Even though he was diagnosed with cancer, he did not stop nor gave up playing, learning, and teaching music.
