= Morq-e sahar =

Iranian song

Morq-e Sahar (Persian: مرغ سحر, often romanised as Morgh-e Sahar, variously translated as Dawn Bird, Bird of the Morning, The Nightingale) is an Iranian tasnif often sung in protest of injustices, dictatorship and tyranny in Iran. Often regarded as the "anthem" of struggles for freedom in Iran, the tasnif was written by Mohammad-Taqi Bahar and composed by Morteza Neidavoud in the early 20th century under the wake of Iranian constitutional revolution. The song's lyrics centre on the metaphor of the bird of dawning or morning that initiates a lament. As the song progresses, it appeals to the caged bird to sing and break free, symbolising the termination of a period of oppression ("night") and the commencement of liberation ("day").

Whilst the first stanza of Morqe Sahar has been described as more lyrical, the second stanza has been described as "dealing with social and political issues". The second stanza was banned by Reza Shah Pahlavi from 1925 until his forced abdication in 1941. This came after the song was performed at a home gathering of the Shah's minister Teymourtash, during which the Shah heard the song. According to a Kayhan article, the second stanza was sung at private parties, where the atmosphere was more suited to political debate in comparison to the preceding stanza that was often sung publicly.

== History ==
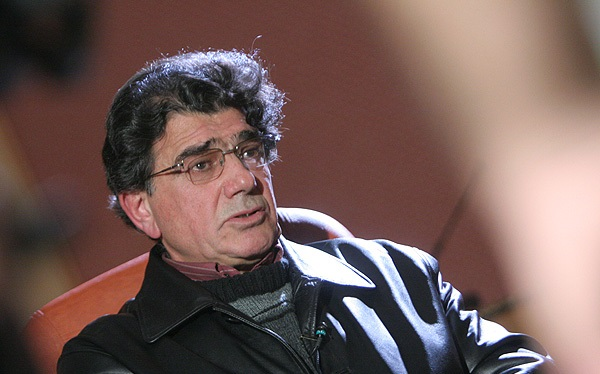
Morqe Sahar is regarded as a "signature" piece of Mohammad Reza Shajarian (pictured in 2007)

The first recording artist to sing Morqe Sahar was Qamar-ol-Moluk Vaziri who sang it in 1924 at a Tehran hotel during her first formal vocal performance. Morqe Sahar was first recorded in 1927 by Iranoddole Helen or Taj Esfahani. One of the first recording is also attributed to the signing of Moluk Zarrabi. It was later performed by numerous Iranian singers including Qamar-ol-Moluk Vaziri, Mohammad-Reza Shajarian, Leila Forouhar, Homayoun Shajarian, Farhad Mehrad, Shakila, Mohsen Namjoo, Reza Sadeghi, and Hengameh Akhavan.

The song is regarded as a hit and a "signature" piece of the highly respected singer Mohammad Reza Shajarian who was often regarded as a public figure voicing for democracy. It was incorporated as the closing segment in all of his concert presentations. In 2020, crowds of mourners congregated to express their sorrow over the passing of Shajarian at the Jam Hospital, where he had been undergoing medical care. During this gathering, the attendees sang Morqe Sahar - often referred to as his "signature" creation - and vocalised slogans denouncing authoritative rule, which led to an encounter with Iranian authorities.

== Lyrics ==
Translation

Oh morning bird, sing your song,
Renew my pain once more.
With a fiery sigh, break this cage,
Shatter it down to the floor.
O bound nightingale, break free from the cage,
Sing a melody of human liberty,
Set this world ablaze with your breath,
With fiery harmony.
Oppression of the oppressor, tyranny of the hunter,
Have ruined my nest,
Oh, God! Oh, heavens! Oh, nature!
Bring dawn to this darkness of ours.

Spring has come, flowers bloom,
Yet my eyes still rain with gloom.
This cage, dark and narrow like my heart,
Set it aflame, oh burning sigh.
Nature’s hand, do not pluck
The flower of my fleeting life.
Oh fresh blossom, turn your gaze,
Look upon the lover’s strife.
Nightingale, exiled from its nest,
Sing of your longing, but in brief.
Sing of your longing, but in brief.

Transliteration

morq-e sahar nāle sar kon
dāq-e mara tāze tar kon
zāhe sharar bār, in ghafas rā
bar shekan o zir o zebar kon
bolbol-e par baste ze konj-e ghafas dar ā
naqme-ye āzādi-ye noe bashar sar ā
vaz nafasi arse-ye in khāke toode rā,
por sharar kon
zolm-e zālem, jor-e sayyād
āshiyānam dāde bar bād
ey khodā, ey falak, ey tabia-a-a-t
shām-e tārik-e mā rā sahar kon

no bahār ast, gol be bār ast
abr e chashmam, Zhāle bār ast
in ghafas chon delam tang o tār ast
shole fekan dar ghafas ey āhe ātashin
dast-e tabiat gol-e omr-e marā machin
jānebe āsheq negah ey tāze gol
az in, bishtar kon, bishtar kon, bishtar kon
morq-e bi del, sharh-e hejrān, mokhtasar, mokhtasar kon

Persian script

مرغ سحر ناله سر کن
داغ مرا تازه تر کن
زآه شرر بار این قفس را
برشکن و زیر و زبر کن
بلبل پربسته ز کنج قفس درآ
نغمه آزادی نوع بشر سرا
وز نفسی عرصه این خاک توده را
پر شرر کن
ظلم ظالم، جور صیاد
آشیانم داده بر باد
ای خدا، ای فلک، ای طبیعت
شام تاریک ما را سحر کن

نوبهار است گل به بار است
ابر چشمم ژاله بار است
این قفس چون دلم تنگ وتار است
شعله فکن در قفس ای آه آتشین
دست طبیعت گل عمر مرا مچین
جانب عاشق نگه ای تازه گل از این
بیشتر کن، بیشتر کن، بیشتر کن
،مرغ بیدل، شرح هجران
مختصر، مختصر کن

== In popular culture ==
- Morq-e Sahar (spelled as "Morghe Sahar") was the theme for the Persian civilization in the videogame Civilization V, and also an ambient theme for the Persian civilization in Civilization VI.
- Morq-e Sahar (spelled as "Morghe Sahar") was featured as the through line in the Academy Award shortlisted documentary feature, The Voice of Dust and Ash, that tells the life story of Maestro Mohammad Reza Shajarian.
