= Talieh Kamran =

Iranian female musician, poet and visual artist (1930-2017)

- طلیعه کامران
- Born: 1930; Tehran, Iran
- Died: March 14, 2017 (aged 86–87); Tehran, Iran
- Education: College of Fine Arts (University of Tehran)
- Occupations: Musician, port, painter

Talieh Kamran (Persian: طلیعه کامران; 1930 – March 14, 2017) was an Iranian santur player, painter, poet, and a pioneer of modern art in Iran. She was known as the "Mother of Traditional Santur Playing in Iran." Kamran played a significant role in the evolution of Iranian classical music and left a lasting legacy through her art and music.

== Biography ==
Talieh Kamran was born in 1930 in Tehran into an artistic family. Her father was a violinist and a student of Hossein Khan Esmailzadeh, while her mother was both musically inclined and engaged in painting. During her childhood, Talieh Kamran was taught to play the santur by Habib Samaei, who was a family friend. From around 1942, Samaei gave her lessons every two weeks, and later, she continued her musical education with Morteza Abdolrasouli, another student of Samaei. She also learned traditional rhythmic patterns and ensemble playing from Hossein Tehrani, who introduced her to Ruhollah Khaleghi.

Kamran became a featured performer in the Iranian National Music Association concerts, playing the santur alongside Tehrani's tombak. Her recorded performance in the Homayoun mode was even presented by Khaleghi in Russia as an example of Iranian female musicians' artistry. In the late 1940s, she studied music notation with Khaleghi and then with Abolhasan Saba. By the mid-1950s, Kamran had notated key pieces she had learned from Habib Samaei, including in the Shur, Avaz-e Abu Ata, Bayat-e Esfahan, and Chahargah modes, which she later published in her book Sections of Habib Samaei's Radif as Narrated by Talieh Kamran (Persian: بخش‌هایی از ردیف حبیب سماعی به روایت طلیعه کامران). Also the book Nine Pishdaramad and Reng from Darvish Khan and Mousa Ma'roufi for Santur (نُه پیش درآمد و رِنگ از درویش خان و موسی معروفی برای سنتور), compiled by Talieh Kamran features nine compositions by these two master composers. Talieh Kamran transcribed and published these works for the santur in the early 1950s, making them accessible for future generations of santur players.

Kamran, in addition to her contributions to music, was also an accomplished painter. Encouraged by her mother, she pursued a degree in painting from the Faculty of Fine Arts at the University of Tehran. She later traveled to Paris and Rome to further develop her skills. Her early work was influenced by Kamal-ol-Molk, but over time, with the influence of Shokouh Riazi, she gravitated toward modern art, becoming one of the pioneering women in Iran's modern art scene.

Kamran participated in the third Tehran Biennial in 1962 and, despite her active engagement in visual arts, held her first solo exhibition in 1968 at the University of Tehran. Throughout her career, she held 11 solo exhibitions and took part in 42 group exhibitions both in Iran and internationally.

She was also a poet, publishing her poetry collections Bi-Nahayat, Nahayat (بی‌نهایت، نهایت; lit. Endless, the End) in 2004 and Az Hich be Hich (از هیچ به هیچ; lit. from Nothing to Nothing) in 2014. Kamran left a lasting mark in both the visual arts and literature, showcasing her versatility as an artist.

== Works ==
=== Music ===
Some of Talieh Kamran's key contributions to music include:

- The album "One Hundred Years of Santur" (2001), Mahour Cultural and Artistic Institute.
- The book "Sections of Habib Samaei's Radif as Narrated by Talieh Kamran" (2009), published by Aref Publishing.
- The book Nine Pishdaramad and Reng from Darvish Khan and Mousa Ma'roufi for Santur, (2018), published by Khonyagar Pub.
- The album Yadegaar-e Habib (2011), where she played the santur accompanied by Hossein Tehrani on tombak and vocals, featuring segments of Habib Samaei's Radif.

=== Visual arts ===
Talieh Kamran had an impressive career in painting, with numerous exhibitions showcasing her work both during her lifetime and posthumously. Some highlights include:

- Third Tehran Biennial, 1962
- Solo exhibition at the Faculty of Fine Arts, Tehran, 1968
- First Biennial of Iranian Painters, Tehran Museum of Contemporary Art, 1991
- "Twenty-One Works" at Seyhoun Gallery, Tehran, 1995
- Solo exhibition titled "Talieh Kamran's Collages and Paintings" at Haft Samar Gallery, Tehran, 2015
- Group exhibition "Pieces of Vocal Art: A Collage Exhibition by Five Female Artists," in tribute to Kamran, at Vista Gallery, Tehran, 2016

After she died several exhibitions were held to honor her impact on modern Iranian painting at venues such as Afrand Gallery (2017), Tarahan Azad Gallery (2017 and 2020), Liam Gallery (2021 and 2023), and Artibition (2022).

=== Poetry ===
- Bi-Nahayat, Nahayat (بی‌نهایت، نهایت; lit. Endless, the End), 2004
- Az Hich be Hich (از هیچ به هیچ; lit. from Nothing to Nothing), 2014

== Death ==
Talieh Kamran, after battling cancer, died March 14, 2017, in Tehran. Her funeral took place the following day, on March 15, 2017, in front of the Tehran Museum of Contemporary Art, and she was buried in Behesht-e Zahra.
