= Fath-Ali Khan Saba =

Iranian poet and writer (1765–1822/3)

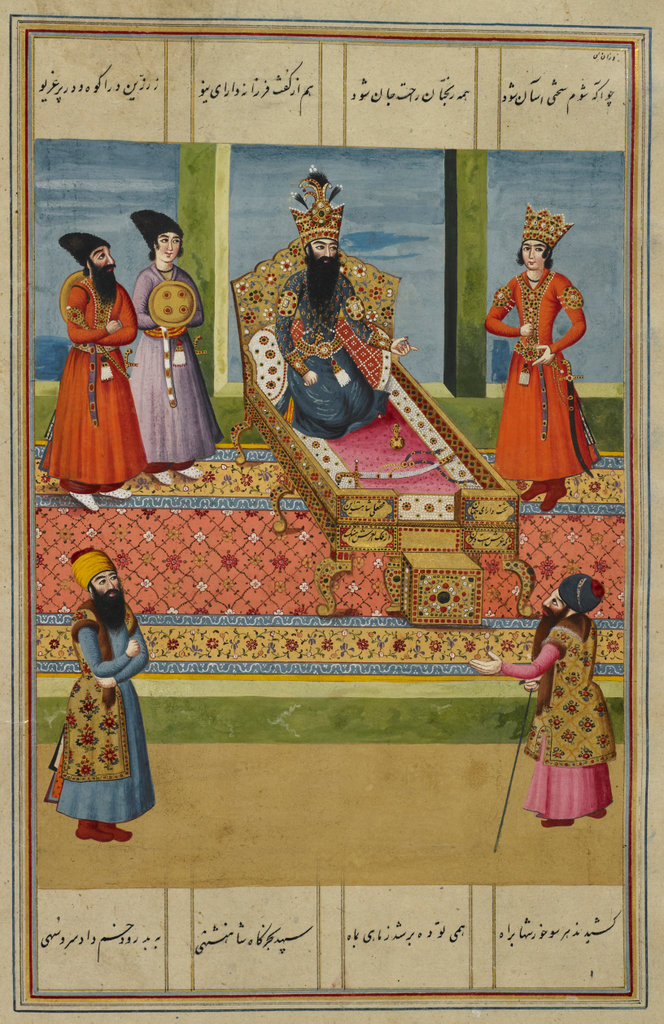
- Fath-Ali Shah Qajar seated on the Peacock Throne attended by a prince (Abbas Mirza?) and two ghulams with his shield and mace, giving audience to two ministers. Folio from the Shahanshah-nameh of Fath-Ali Khan Saba, dated 1810
- Born: 1765; Kashan, Zand Iran
- Died: 1822/1823; Tehran, Qajar Iran
- Notable work: Shahanshah-nameh
- Children: Andalib; Abol-Qasem Forugh
- Father: Agha Mohammad Zarrabi
- Relatives: Mohammad-Ali Khan (brother); Ahmad Khan Sabur (nephew); Mahmud Khan Malek al-Sho'ara (grandson)

Fath-Ali Khan Saba (Persian: فتحعلی خان صبا) was a court poet under Fath-Ali Shah Qajar (r. 1797–1834), who dedicated an imitation of the Persian epic poem Shahnameh ("Book of Kings") to him, entitled Shahanshah-nameh ("Book of the King of Kings").

== Background ==
Saba was most likely born in about 1765, in the city of Kashan, then ruled by the Zand dynasty. His family was descended from the Donboli, a Kurdish tribe that resided around Khoy in the Azerbaijan region of Iran. His grandfather Amir Ghayath Beg was a commander in the Safavid army and had made a mistake that led to the deaths of some of his Donboli soldiers. He therefore chose not go back to his homeland out of embarrassment and instead stayed in Kashan, where he died in 1733 or 1734. He was survived by his son Agha Mohammad Zarrabi, who was Saba's father.

== Career ==
Under the Zand and Qajar dynasties, members of Saba's family served as governors and officials. His father served as the Zand governor of Kashan, and his elder brother, Mohammad-Ali Khan, served as minister of the last Zand ruler Lotf Ali Khan (r. 1789–1794). Saba also appears to have been associated with Loft Ali Khan, reportedly praising him in his poems.

In 1794, after Loft Ali left Kerman to avoid the Qajars, their shah (king) Agha Mohammad Khan Qajar (r. 1789–1797) had Mohammad-Ali Khan captured and executed. After the incident, Saba was frightened that he might also get killed, thus wandering from one location to another, until he found sanctuary with the Qajar prince Baba Khan (later known by his regnal name Fath-Ali Shah Qajar), who was then governor-general of the Fars province. The divan (collection of poems) that contained the poems Saba written in honor of the Zands, was allegedly destroyed by him after he switched allegiance to the Qajars.

When Baba Khan became the new Qajar shah in 1797, Saba dedicated a qasideh (ode) to him, which was highly appreciated. Up until he was chosen as the court's poet laureate, Saba's fortunes were prosperous. He had the honorific title of Ehtesab al-Mamalek ("Censor of the Provinces") and for some time held the governorship of Qom and Kashan. However, he eventually gave up his administrative duties to work full-time at the court. Fath-Ali Shah had Saba with him on his different operations and journeys. In 1813, during one of those operations involving Iran's war with Russia, Saba began writing his lengthy epic poem Shahanshah-nameh ("Book of the King of Kings") at Fath-Ali Shah's request. The epic poem was an imitation of another Persian epic, the Shahnameh ("Book of Kings").

The Scottish traveller James Baillie Fraser described his encounter with Saba in 1821;

"The day following we paid a visit to Futeh Allee Khan, the shah-ul shaer, or malek-ul-shaer, poet laureate of the kingdom. This very interesting old man, who is descended of an ancient family, for several successive generations governors of Cashan, possesses much genius, a lively imagination, and good taste; he is singularly well informed in, and has a great taste for, mechanics; having constructed several complicated pieces of machinery of his own invention, in a very ingenious manner, and even succeeded in making a printing press, from the plates in the Encyclopaedia Britannica."

Saba died in Tehran in 1822 or 1823. He established the Saba family, which is still present today and has produced scholars, artists, and people with distinguished professions. Since several of Saba's family members were prominent writers throughout the Qajar era, they hold a special position in the history of 19th-century Persian literature. This includes his son Mirza Hossein Khan (known by his pen-name Andalib), who succeeded him as the court's poet laureate, a position the latter also held under the next shah, Mohammad Shah Qajar (r. 1834–1848). Other people included Saba's youngest son Abol-Qasem Forugh, his nephew Ahmad Khan Sabur, and his grandson Mahmud Khan Malek al-Sho'ara—the latter of whom was the poet laureate of Naser al-Din Shah Qajar (r. 1848–1896).

Abolhasan Saba, the popular 20th-century composer and instrumentalist, also belonged to the Saba family.

== Sources ==
- Amanat, Mehrdad (2018). "Kashan iii. History to the Pahlavi Period". Encyclopaedia Iranica.
- Floor, Willem (1999). "Art (Naqqashi) and Artists (Naqqashan) in Qajar Persia". Muqarnas. 13. Brill: 125–154. doi:10.2307/1523268. JSTOR 1523268. (registration required)
- Katouzian, Homa (2013). Iran: Politics, History and Literature. Routledge. ISBN 978-0415636902.
- Melville, Charles (2022). "Introduction". In Melville, Melville (ed.). The Contest for Rule in Eighteenth-Century Iran: Idea of Iran Vol. 11. I.B.Tauris. pp. 1–8. ISBN 978-0755645992.
- Rahman, Munibur (1995). "Ṣabā". In Bosworth, C. E.; van Donzel, E.; Heinrichs, W. P. & Lecomte, G. (eds.). The Encyclopaedia of Islam, Second Edition. Volume VIII: Ned–Sam. Leiden: E. J. Brill. ISBN 978-90-04-09834-3.
