= Reza Mahjubi =

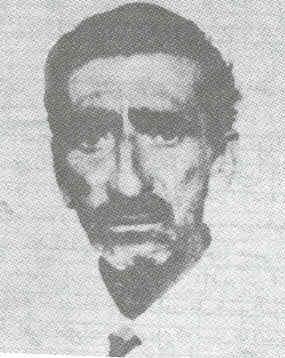
- Reza Mahjubi, Persian musician

Background information
- Born: 1898
- Origin: Persian (Iranian)
- Died: July 20, 1954 (aged 56)
- Occupations: composer and violinist
- Instrument: violin

Reza Mahjubi (Persian: رضا محجوبی; 1898 – 14 July 1954) was a Persian (Iranian) composer and violinist.

== Biography ==
=== Birth and Childhood ===
Reza Mahjubi was born in 1898 in Tehran, into a musical family. His father, Abbasali Nazer, used to play ney, and his mother, Fakhrosadat, played piano. Both Reza and his younger brother, Morteza, therefore developed an early interest in music and later pursued careers as musicians.

=== Teachers ===
Mahjubi's first teacher was Hossein Hang Afarin, an army music officer. He was later taught by Ebrahim Ajang, but left these lessons after disagreeing with Ajang's emphasis on musical theory over less formal learning. Instead, he trained with Hossein Khan Esmail Zade, a master player of kamancheh, from whom Mahjubi also learned to play the violin.

=== Professional life ===
When Mahjubi was 16 his father opened a cafe in Tehran's Lalezar Street. Mahjubi and his brother played to entertain the customers, and quickly attracted attention. At 25 Mahjubi began to teach music classes; he continued composing new works and performing concerts at the same time. In 1923 he conducted some popular concerts with Darvish Khan and Aref Qazvini. Poet Amiri Firuzkuhi was among his close friends. He was considered one of the finest improvising violinists of his time, and although his working life was short, several of his compositions became influential models for later composers.

Mahjubi suffered a nervous illness at age 24. He recovered through treatment, but underwent personality changes, and the resulting psychological problems eventually contributed to his death. Though he continued to recognize his friends, some of his speech became incomprehensible.

=== Death ===
Reza Mahjubi died at the age of 56, on 20 July 1954, and was buried in Zahiroddole cemetery.

== Students ==
Among Mahjubi's most famous students were Roohollah Khaleghi and Majid Vafadar, the creator of: Mara beboos, Golnar, Zohre, Gol umad bahar umad, and Sham'e shabane.

== Works ==
Some of his chaharmezrabs, pishdaramads and tasnifs have remained in Abu Ata and Dashti dastgahs. Most of his works are in the style of Darvish Khan.

Among his famous pishdaramads are Pishdaramade Esfehan, which has been arranged recently by Farhad Fakhreddini for the Kife Englisi serial.
