= Farhani =

Farhani is a surname which is mostly used in Iran and in other Muslim countries. It means "cheerful, talented and soft hearted." Notable people with the surname are as follows:

- Abdul Karim Farhani (born 1964), Iranian Ayetollah and politician
- Fadia Farhani (born 1996), Tunisian taekwondo practitioner

== See also ==
- Farahani, list of people with a similar surname
