= Varto Terian =

Armenian Iranian actor (1896–1974)

- وارتو طریان
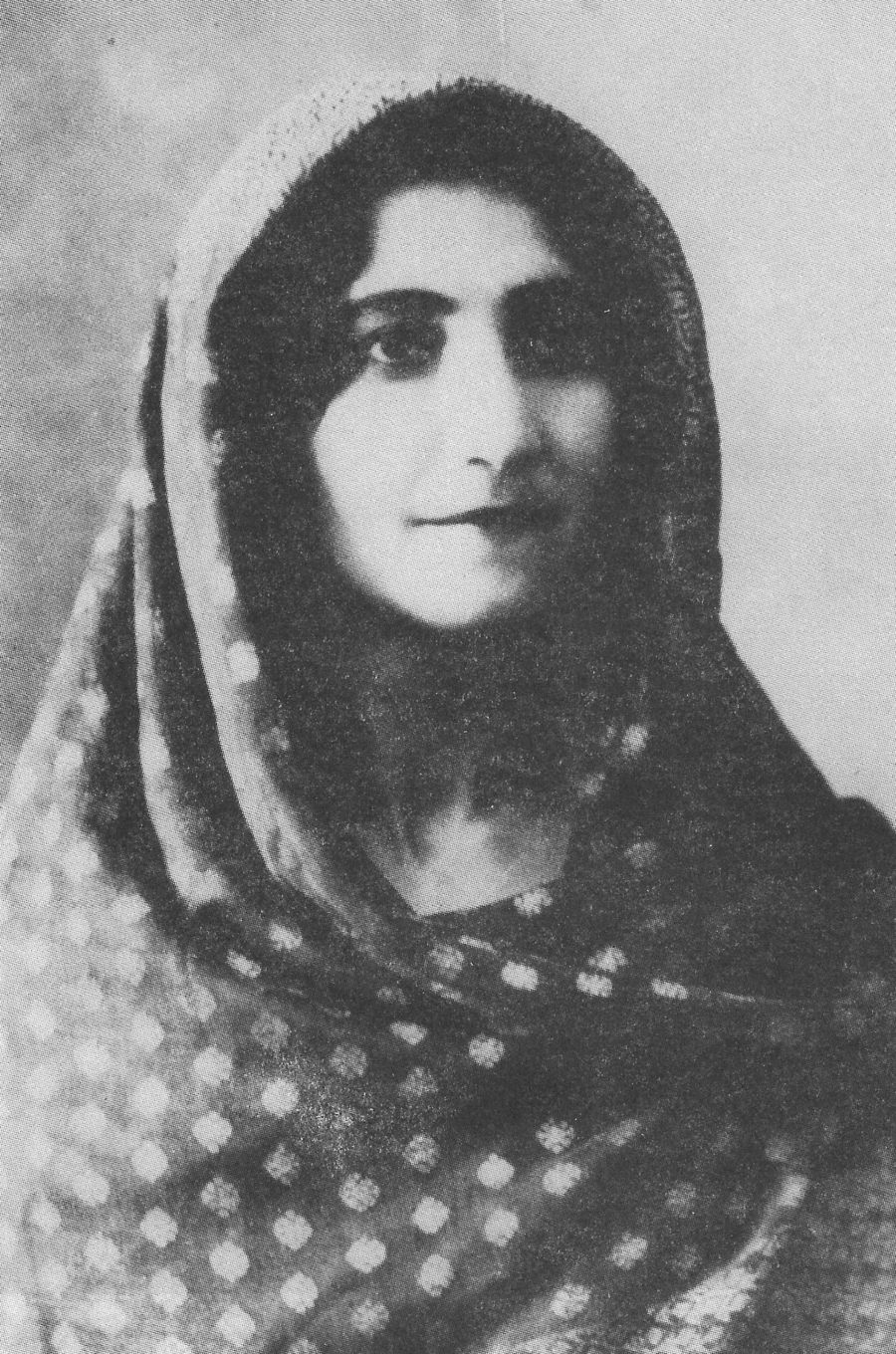
- Born: 11 May 1896; Tabriz, Sublime State of Iran
- Died: 2 October 1974 (aged 78); Tehran, Imperial State of Iran
- Other names: Varto Teryan, Vartu Terian, LaLa
- Education: University of Geneva
- Occupations: Actress, educator
- Known for: Iran’s first actress of theater
- Spouse: Arto Terian (married)
- Children: Alenush Terian

Varto Terian (Persian: وارتو طریان; 11 May 1896 – 2 October 1974) also known by the pseudonym LaLa, was an Iranian-born Armenian actress and educator. She was Iran’s first stage actress of theater.

== Early life and education ==
Varto Terian was born on 11 May 1896, in Tabriz, Qajar Iran, to an Armenian family. When she was a child her family moved to Tehran.

After high school she moved to Switzerland to continue her studies at the University of Geneva, where she focused on acting. When she returned to Iran, many theater groups had recently been formed including the Young Armenians Theater Society in Tehran. She met her future husband Arto Terian (1892–1954) at the theater society, he later became a successful actor and theater director.

== Career ==
After their marriage, in 1914, she launched her theater career. During the 1910s–1920s, women were banned from theater acting and attendance in Iran. In order to protect their family, she performed under the name LaLa, and Arto used the name Arizad. The couple were the main members of the Armenian Theater of Tehran from 1923 to 1932. Later, the couple joined the Young Iran Society, founded by Abdolhossein Teymourtash.

Terian was also a professor of French language and literature at the Teachers College Tehran. Her daughter was astronomer and physicist, Alenush Terian.

== See also ==
- Qamar-ol-Moluk Vaziri
- Women's rights movement in Iran
