= Hossein Hang Afarin =

Hossein Hang Afarin (Persian: حسين هنگ آفرین) (1878 – 1952) was a Persian (Iranian) band conductor of the Cossack Brigade, conductor of Okhovvat society (Persian: انجمن اخوت) orchestra, and performer of setar. Studied military music under the French musician Monsieur Lemaire and Persian classical music under Mirza Abdollah. He is regarded by Ruhollah Khaleqi as an accomplished musician and setar performer of his time. Aside from leading the Brigade bands he taught setar, violin, and piano privately. He is credited for creating many famous musicians such as Nasrollah Zarrin Panjeh (Persian: نصرالله زرین پنجه), Reza Mahjubi and Morteza Mahjubi.
