= Alenush Terian =

Iranian astronomer and physicist (1921–2011)

Alenoush Terian
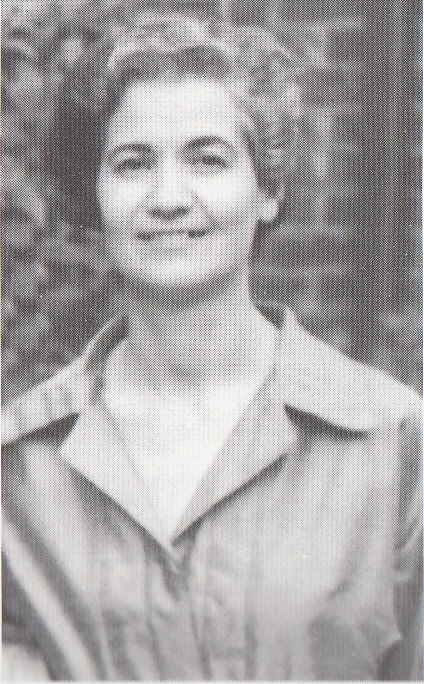
- Born: 9 November 1921; Tehran, Sublime State of Iran
- Died: 4 March 2011 (aged 89); Tehran, Iran
- Resting place: Doulab Cemetery
- Education: University of Tehran; Sorbonne University
- Known for: Mother of Modern Iranian astronomy
- Scientific career
- Fields: Physics, astronomy
- Academic advisors: Kamaloddin Jenab

Ālenush Teriān (Armenian: Ալենուշ Տէրեան; Persian: آلنوش طریان or آلنوش تریان; 9 November 1921 – 4 March 2011) was an Iranian-Armenian astronomer and physicist and is called 'Mother of Modern Iranian Astronomy'.

== Early life ==
She was born on 9 November 1921, to an Armenian family in Tehran, Iran. Her father, Arto, was a stage director, poet and translator (with the pen name Arizad meaning Born to Aryan) who had translated the Shahnameh, from Persian to Armenian. Her mother, Varto Terian, was a stage actress and director.

== Education ==
Teriān graduated in 1947 in the Science Department of University of Tehran. She began her career in the physics laboratory of this university and was elected the chief of laboratory operations in the same year.

She left Iran for France, by her father's financial support, where in 1956 she obtained her doctorate in atmospheric physics from Sorbonne University. Upon this she returned to Iran and became assistant professor in thermodynamics at University of Tehran. Later she worked in solar physics in the then West Germany for a period of four months through a scholarship that was awarded by the German government to University of Tehran. In 1964 Teriān became the first female professor of physics in Iran.

In 1966, Teriān became a member of the Geophysics Committee of the University of Tehran. In 1969, she was elected chief of the solar physics studies at this university and began to work in the solar observatory, of which she was one of the founders. Teriān retired in 1979. At the time of her death she was living in Tehran.

Teriān's 90th birthday celebration in Tehran was attended by a number of Iranian parliamentarians and over 100 Iranian Armenians.

Terian died on 4 March 2011, at the age of 90.

== See also ==
- Women in Iran
- Iranian Armenians
