= Manoochehr Sadeghi =

Iranian-American musician (born 1938)

Manoochehr Sadeghi منوچهر صادقی
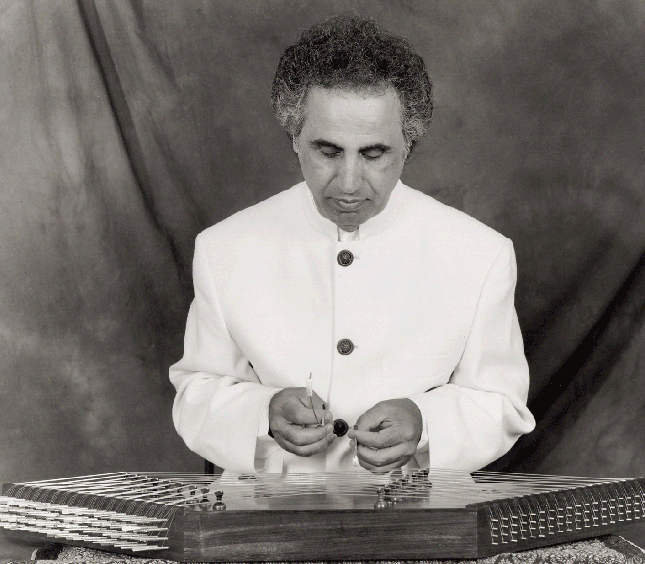
- Sadeghi representing the correct hand and body posture when performing the santur

Background information
- Born: April 13, 1938 (age 88); Tehran, Iran
- Genres: Persian classical music, world music
- Occupations: Santur virtuoso, teacher, lecturer, composer, producer, pedagogue
- Instrument: Santur
- Years active: 1961–present
- Labels: UCLA, WB
- Website: santur.com

Manoochehr Sadeghi, live santur improvisation

Concertino for Santur, by Hossein Dehlavi and Faramarz Payvar
Played by Sadeghi and Dehlavi

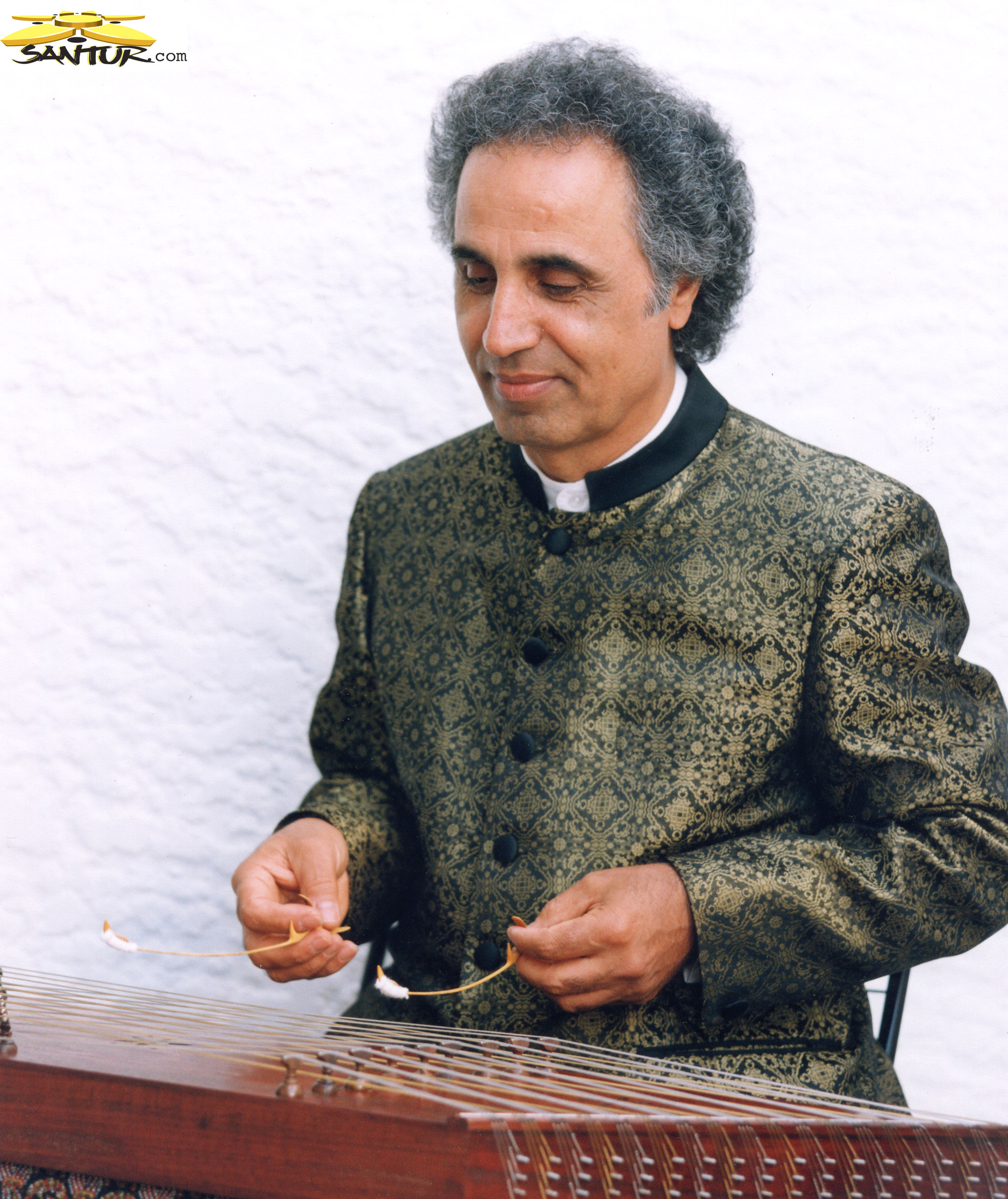
Manoochehr Sadeghi

Manoochehr Sadeghi (born April 13, 1938) is a Persian-American naturalized citizen, born in Tehran, Iran. He is considered an ustad (grand master) of the santur, a Persian hammered dulcimer. He has been lecturing, teaching, recording and performing Persian classical music on the santur professionally for over 50 years. In 2002, Sadeghi received the Durfee Foundation Master Musician Award and he is a recipient of a 2003 National Heritage Fellowship from the National Endowment of the Arts, which is the United States' highest honor in the folk and traditional arts.

== Early life ==
Sadeghi began studying the santur at the age of 7 with a music teacher coincidentally named Manoochehr Sadeghian. By the age of 14 he became the prized pupil of a legendary figure in Persian classical music, Abolhasan Saba, who was a master and creator of the Radif of Saba, considered today's manual to mastering Persian classical music. At the age of 19 he performed in Saba's first orchestra of the State Fine Arts Department of Iran. After performing on Iran's television and radio, he went on to stage live concerts around the world for various heads of state. In 1964, Sadeghi emigrated to the United States to pursue his education and career. First at the California State University, Fullerton, and then at UCLA, where he began teaching and performing while earning his degrees. In 1973 he was awarded the Fulbright-Hays Doctoral Dissertation Research Abroad Fellowship Program.

== Career ==
Sadeghi has a variety of students whom he teaches at home and on the internet. Sadeghi is compiling his lessons into an online music school to preserve his knowledge, technique and personal style through contemporary Persian classical improvisation. He is preparing for a series of concerts after the release of his next album. He taught private lessons in Iran from 1953 to 1964 and then in the United States from 1966 to the present. Sadeghi was a teacher at the Conservatory of Persian National Music in Iran from 1958 until 1964 on the faculty at UCLA’s Department of Ethnomusicology from 1967 to 1997. He also taught Persian classical music theory, history and performance, and gave annual concerts on campus and abroad. He composed the music of the John Whitney movie "Arabesque" released in 1975 : a short experimental film showing digital synthesis of sounds and visuals.

== Award ==
- In 2025, he received a Carnegie Corporation of New York Great Immigrant Award.
