= Tuba Azmudeh =

- طوبی آزموده
- Born: 1878; Tehran, Qajar Iran (now Iran)
- Died: 1936 (aged 57–58); Tehran, Pahlavi Iran (now Iran)
- Occupations: Teacher, school founder
- Known for: Established the first Iranian school for girls in Iran

Tuba Azmudeh (Persian: طوبی آزموده; 1878–1936) was an Iranian educator who established the first school for girls in Iran in 1907. She maintained and expanded the school, despite continuous opposition from her community.

== Early life ==
Azmudeh married an officer in the army when she was fourteen. Her husband supported her continued education, which she pursued both independently and with the help of language tutors.

== Namus School ==
In 1907 or 1911, a group of women met in Tehran to discuss and work towards improving the education of girls in Iran. At the time, girls were not usually educated outside of their homes. Though a small number of schools for girls had been opened by foreigners as early as 1874, the Iranian government did not allow Muslim girls to attend schools until 1896.

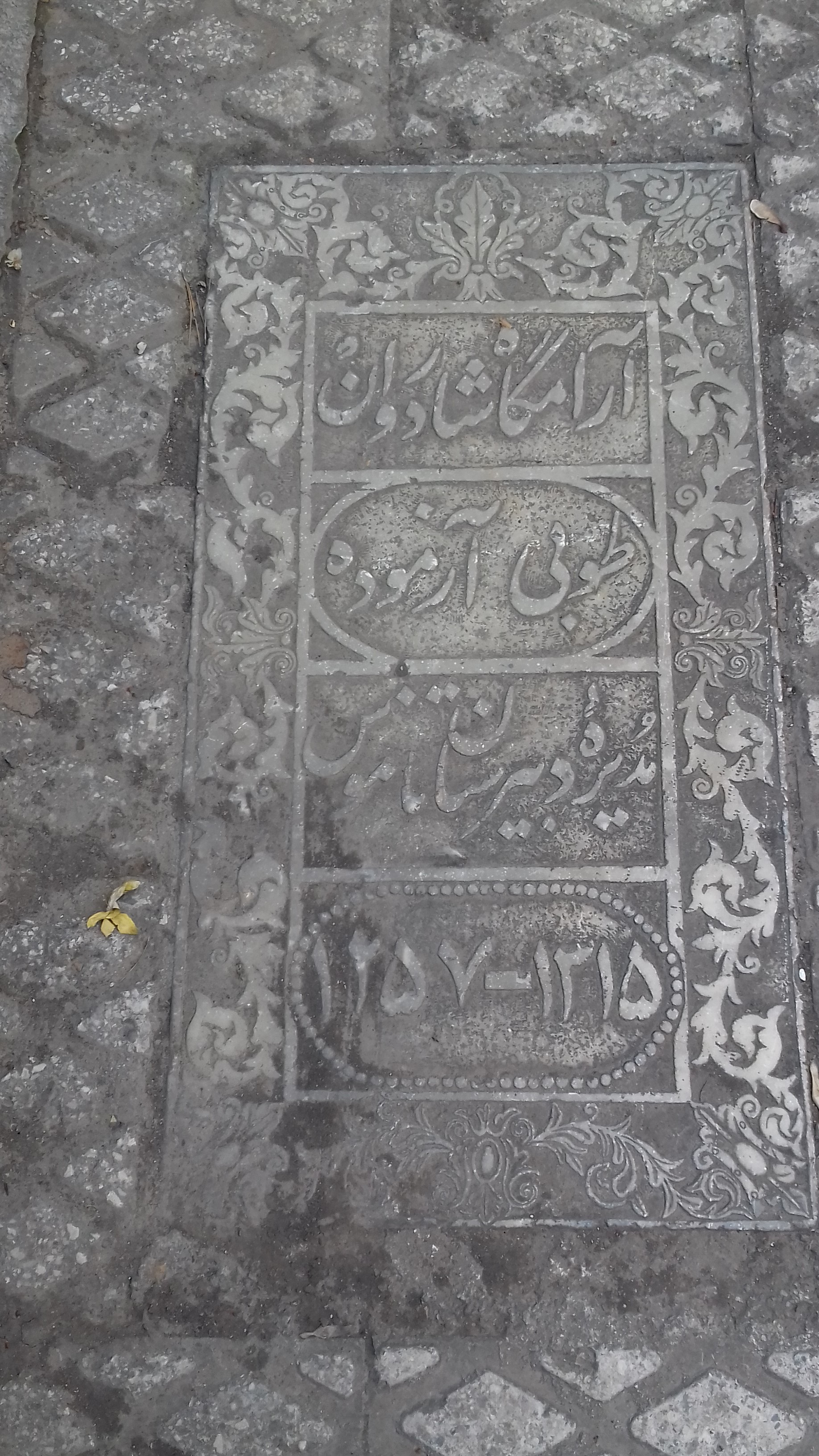
Her gravestone in Zahir-od-Dowleh Cemetery

After this meeting, Azmudeh opened the first Iranian school for girls in Iran, called the Namus School (after Namus, roughly honor). She ran the school in her home in Tehran, where she taught twenty girls. As it was not a state-run school, Azmudeh was responsible for protecting it herself. She and her pupils received considerable criticism from the community and the government. Her pupils were criticized for studying outside of their own homes, and accused of being prostitutes. Azmudeh continuously received threats, both to her life and to the school, and was denigrated as immoral.

The Namus School expanded in size and curriculum, and Azmudeh eventually brought in her husband and friends to help teach. The school eventually achieved some prestige, and progressive Iranians began to send their daughters to study there. Azmudeh later began to also offer literacy classes to adult women.

== Legacy ==
Azmudeh has been credited for inspiring other female educators in Iran. A number of her pupils later studied to become secondary school teachers themselves.

The name of Namus School was later changed to Shahnaz High School.
