= Ali-Akbar Farahani =

Iranian musician

Ali-Akbar Farahani آقا علی‌اکبر فراهانی
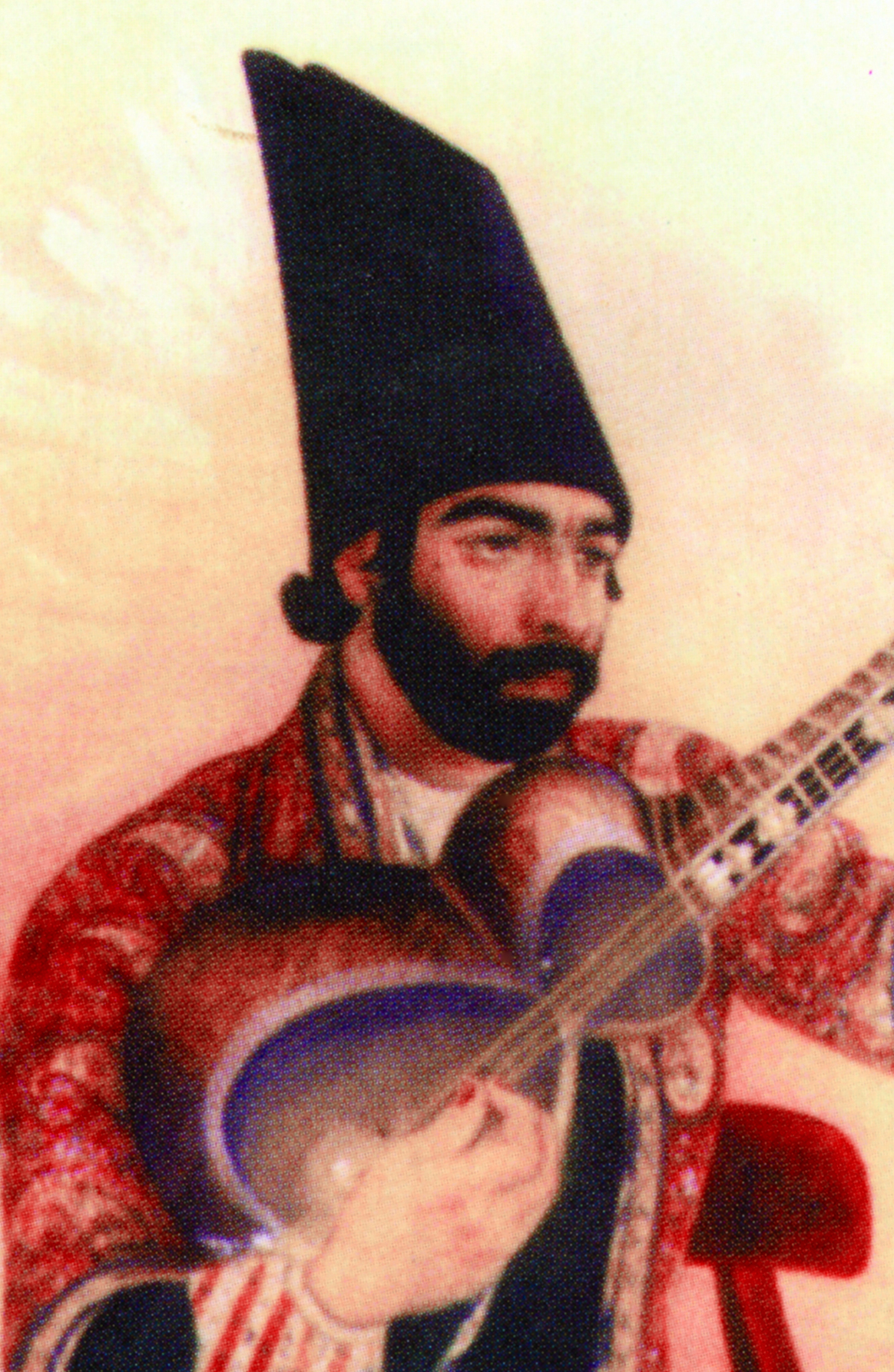
- Born: Between 1821 and 1827; Farahan, Qajar Iran
- Died: Between 1857 and 1862; Tehran, Qajar Iran
- Occupations: Musician; tar player
- Known for: Radif of Persian traditional music
- Children: Mirza Abdollah, Mirza Hossein-Qoli

Āghā Ali-Akbar Farāhāni (Persian: آقا علی‌اکبر فراهانی), known as Āghā Ali Akbar (آقا على‌اكبر), was a notable and well-known musician of Persian traditional music, and tar and setar player in 19th century Persia. He was leading the musicians in the court of Naser al-Din Shah in the early years of his reign. He was the father of two significant musicians, Mirza Abdollah and Mirza Hossein-Qoli, and the paternal grandfather of other outstanding musicians, Ahmad Ebadi, Mirza Abdollah's son, and Ali-Akbar and Zinatolmolouk Shahnazi, children of Mirza Hossein-Qoli . He died in Iran in January 1862.

== Sources ==
- Pourjavadi, Amir Hossein (2019). "آقا علی‌اکبر فراهانی". The Great Islamic Encyclopaedia (in Persian).
