= Habib Samaei =

Habib Samaei حبیب سُماعی

Background information
- Also known as: Habib Samā'i; Habib Somaei, Ḥabib Somā'i
- Born: 1905; Tehran, Qajar Iran
- Origin: Iran
- Died: 11 July 1946 (aged 41) Iran
- Occupation: Musician
- Instrument: Santoor

Habib Samaei (Persian: حبیب سُماعی, romanized: Habib Samāʿi, born 1905 – 11 July 1946), also written as Habib Somā'i, was an Iranian musician, santoor player and music teacher. He has been referred to as the "father of contemporary Iranian santoor playing".

== Biography ==
Habib Samaei was born in 1905 in Tehran, Qajar Iran. His father, Habib Soma Hozour, was a famous musician of the Qajar era, and his son introduced Habib to music from the age of four. Young Samaei at this time played the tombak (a type of drum) while his father playing the santoor. Because of Samaei's small size, he placed the instrument on his pillow and accompanied his father. After the age of six, his father began teaching Samaei to play the santoor.

In the book "History of Iranian Music", Ruhollah Khaleqi writes in part of his memoir about his first meeting with Soma Hozour and his young son:

"... Soma Hozour pull a towel on the santoor, held the mallets and began to play. He had not hit a few more beats when he pointed to his son, to picked up the tombak and accompanied him. Little habib hugged tombak and played softly with his delicate fingers. There was no sound except the beating of the master and the support of the beat…»

At the age of 10, Samaei's santoor sound was approved and admired by artists such as Nayeb Assadollah and Agha Hosseinghli. He became acquainted with music theory, but did not use what he had learned to record his works, and continued his art in a "breast-to-breast" manner.

Soma Huzar moved to Mashhad with his family late in life, which is why Samaei's santoor became famous in Mashhad. He later joined the army because of his interests.

After the death of his father, Samaei returned to Tehran and, with the guidance of his artist friend Abolhassan Saba, inaugurated his santoor class.

Samaei, who was introduced as "Somaei" and was the only student of one of the last santour musicians (Soma Hozour), was one of the first musicians to play on the radio in 1940 after the opening of the Tehran Transmitter Broadcasting Center. From this time on, the public got to know him and his art. At this time, the officials of the country's music department and Ruhollah Khaleqi, who was the deputy director of the music department, tried to transfer him from the position of an army officer to the Ministry of Culture, with the position of santoor student. Samaei initially agreed to this and trained students in the country's music department, but due to his interest in officer's uniform, he soon regretted it, returned to the army and was transferred to the Persian Ministry of War.

In 1943, he was one of the artists who joined the National Music Association as a founding member and held concerts with other artists.

== Personal life ==
Samaei had a romantic relationship with Parvaneh, the singer of that time, and this love influenced his music. Ruhollah Khaleqi mentions the five pages left by Parvaneh and Samaei, which are still very influential after seventy years of their lives. "The untimely death of the market butterfly warmed these pages."

Some time later, the untimely death of a young child from his second marriage further aggravated his mental condition. Ruhollah Khaleqi has said in this regard: "His temperament was getting weaker day by day, as he did not have more than a few kilos of skin and bones."

== Illness and death ==
Samaei contracted pneumonia in February 1945 due to a cold and fell ill. "Samaei does not have a healthy organ in his body and has been hostile to him as much as possible," said one doctor.

Finally, Samaei died on 11 July 1946, at the age of 41, and was buried in Zahir-od-dowleh cemetery.

== Artwork ==
Samaei was not interested in recording his works. From him, only Gramophone record with the sound of "Parvaneh" are left, the total time of which is less than an hour.

- Gramophone record Mahur and Delkash
- Gramophone record Shur and Shahnaz
- Gramophone record Abu'ata and Hejaz
- Gramophone record Esfahan and Byaterajei
- Gramophone record Zarbiye Shahnaz and Gereyli
- Music album and book "Habib Somaei's beats", containing 20 pieces of Habib Somaei's beats, compiled and played by Majid Kiani.

== Legacy ==
Talieh Kamran, a deciple and student of Habib Samaei, published the book "Sections of Habib Samaei's Radif as Narrated by Talieh Kamran" in 2009. She also released a music album titled "Yadgare Habib" (Habib's Legacy) in 2011, where she played the santur, accompanied by the tombak and vocals of Hossein Tehrani. This album contains segments of Habib Samaei's Radif (traditional Persian musical repertoire).
