= Aref Qazvini =

Iranian poet, lyricist, and musician (1882–1934)

Abolqassem Aref Qazvini National Poet
- ابوالقاسم عارف قزوینی
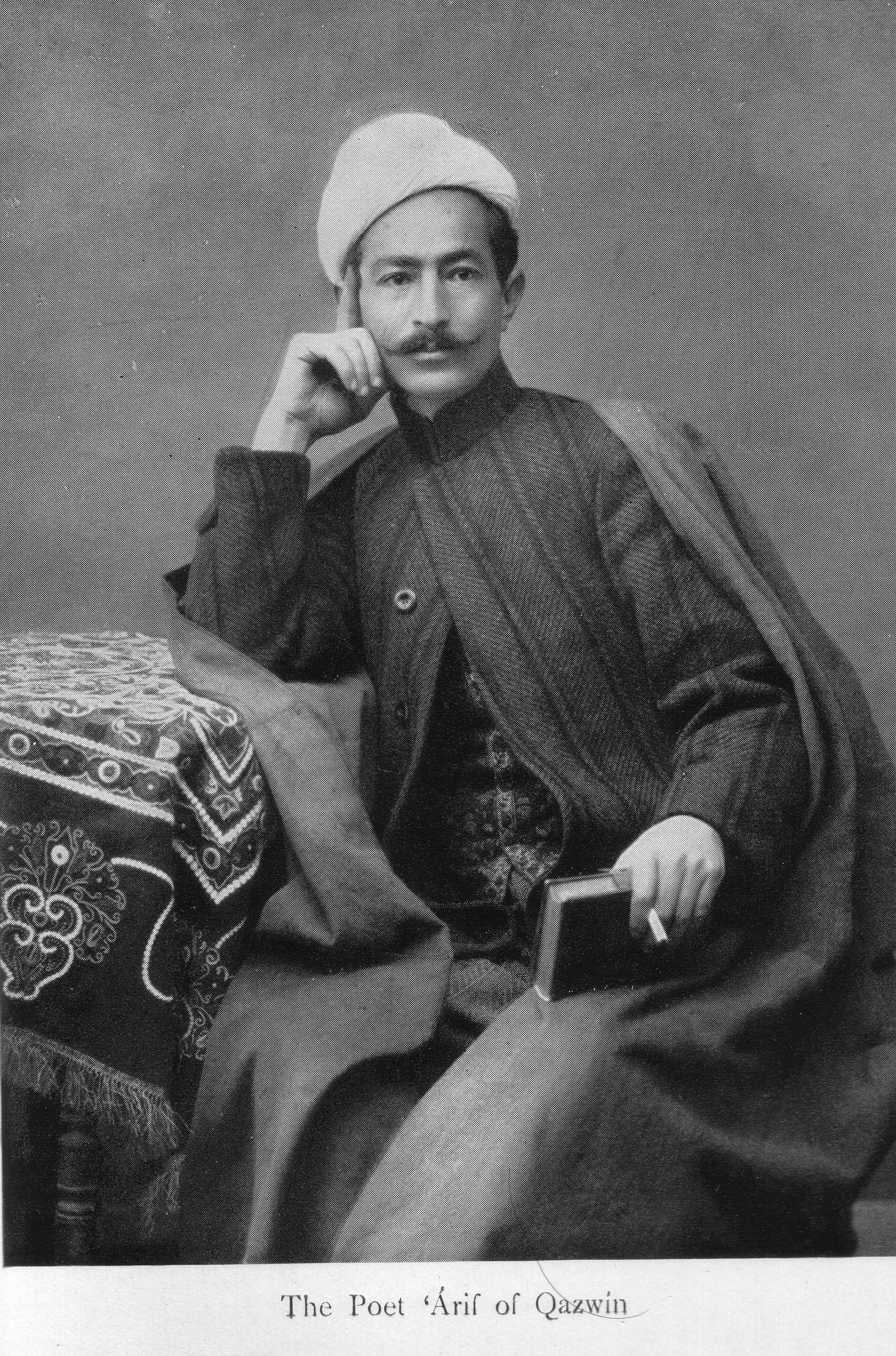
- Born: 1882; Qazvin, Sublime State of Iran
- Died: 21 January 1934 (aged 51–52); Hamadan, Imperial State of Iran
- Other name: Aref Ghazvini

Abolqassem Aref Qazvini or َAref Qazvini (Persian: ابوالقاسم‌ عارف قزوینی; 1882 – 21 January 1934), also known as the National Poet (Persian: شاعر ملی), was a distinguished Iranian poet, lyricist, and musician. Known for his significant contributions to Persian literature and music, Aref Qazvini's work continues to influence and inspire. His artistic legacy encompasses both his poignant poetry and his lyrical compositions, reflecting the cultural and social nuances of his time.

== Biography ==
Aref Qazvini was a renowned Iranian poet, lyricist, and musician. Born in Qazvin, he became celebrated for his deeply patriotic and revolutionary poetry, earning the title of a national poet. His works were a significant part of the Iranian Constitutional Revolution, where his political and pro-revolutionary songs rallied many to the cause.

Aref Qazvini's contributions extended beyond poetry to include lyrics for numerous songs, showcasing his musical talents. His compositions often reflected his revolutionary spirit and love for Iran. In his later years, he moved to Hamadan, where he died in January 1934 at the age of 52.

Posthumously, his complete works were published in Berlin and Tehran. One of his notable poems, The Imprisoned Bird's Moaning (Persian: ناله مرغ اسیر), is a call to his compatriots to fight for their freedom. In the poem's first six verses, Aref urges the people to reject foreign assistance and sacrifice their lives for their nation's sovereignty. He criticises the Shah, portraying him as an enemy of the people, reflecting the poet's patriotic sentiments and anti-colonial attitudes prevalent during the Constitutional period.

The poem uses powerful imagery to convey its message. Birds symbolize freedom, with the caged bird representing oppressed individuals unable to express themselves. This metaphor serves to warn the countrymen against silence and passivity, likening it to the despair of caged birds. Another symbol, the wind, represents liberty in Persian literature, signifying hope and the widespread call for freedom. The wind's universal reach underscores the necessity for all Iranians to unite in saving their country.

Aref Qazvini's poetry often questioned the bourgeoisie system, challenging the ruling class's ideology. By addressing his fellow countrymen, he aimed to empower them to resist authority and fight for a free and independent Iran. His work remains a testament to his enduring impact on Persian literature and the revolutionary spirit of his time.

== Life ==
=== Birth and early years ===
Abolqasem Aref Qazvini was born in Qazvin in c. 1882. (Note: Constantin Chaykin, a Russian orientalist, is said to have given Aref's birth year as 1295 AH (c. 1878–1879), and Mohammad Hezar—Aref's friend and author of Arefnameh-ye Hezar—as about 1297 AH (c. 1879–1880). However, the cover of Divan-e Aref (Berlin edition) published during his lifetime reportedly gives 1300 AH (c. 1882–1883).) His birthplace in Qazvin is given as the "Panbeh-riseh" neighborhood. His father was "Molla Hadi Vakil", who worked as a legal representative in Qazvin. His mother's name was Khanom-Naz, and Aref was their third son. His ancestors were from the Maraghiyan of Rudbar-e Mohammad-Zaman Khan (in the Rudbar region of Alamut). Two generations before Aref, they were Zoroastrians.

Aref learned Arabic and Persian grammar in Qazvin, and wrote shekasteh and nasta'liq very well. He learned Iranian traditional music in 14 months with Mirza Sadeq Kharazi. (Note: After moving to Tehran, Aref reportedly also studied music and performance for a time with Aqa Hossein-Qoli.) For a period, at his father's insistence, he attended the sermons of Mirza Hossein Va'ez (one of Qazvin's preachers), performed noha recitation, and wore a turban; after his father's death, he removed the turban and stopped Rawda Khwani.

Aref had two older brothers. According to Aref himself, his parents argued constantly, which made life difficult for him and his brothers. He held a negative view of his father, describing him as treacherous and lacking judgment. His resentment was such that after his father's death he acted contrary to his father's wishes: he did not take the body to Karbala for burial, and he turned inherited land that his father had willed for Rowzeh-khani into a vineyard so that wine production could take place there. Nevertheless, he also states that his father did not neglect helping him learn calligraphy and music.

=== Marriage ===
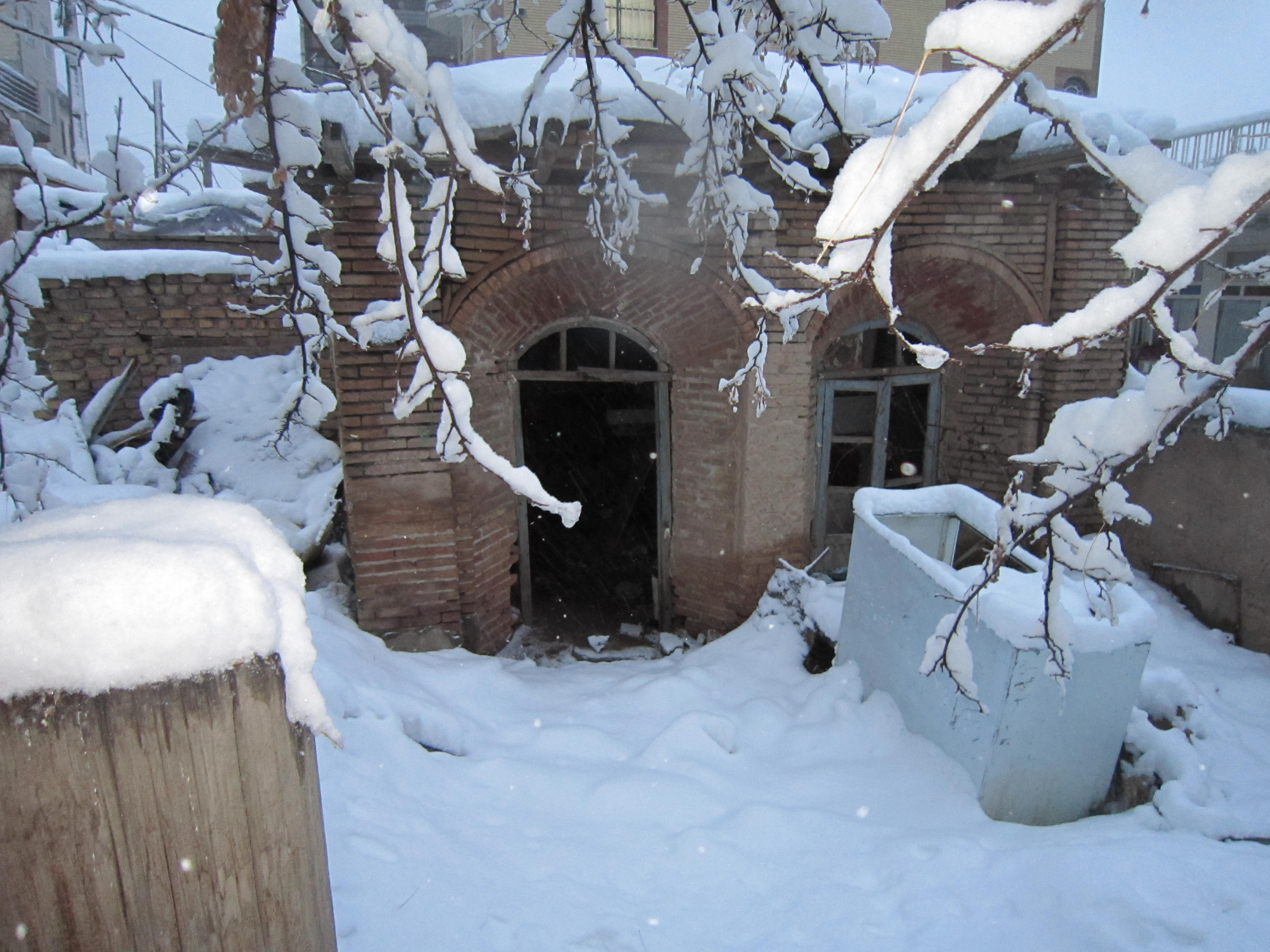
Aref Qazvini's house in the Hamdollah Mostowfi neighborhood of Qazvin

At the age of 17, Aref became interested in a girl named "Khanom-Bala" and secretly married her. He composed the tasnif "I Saw a Beloved" (Persian: دیدم صنمی) in her praise. After her family found out, pressure on Aref increased and he was forced to go to Rasht; after returning, despite strong affection, he divorced her and never married again.

=== Middle years and the Constitutional Revolution ===
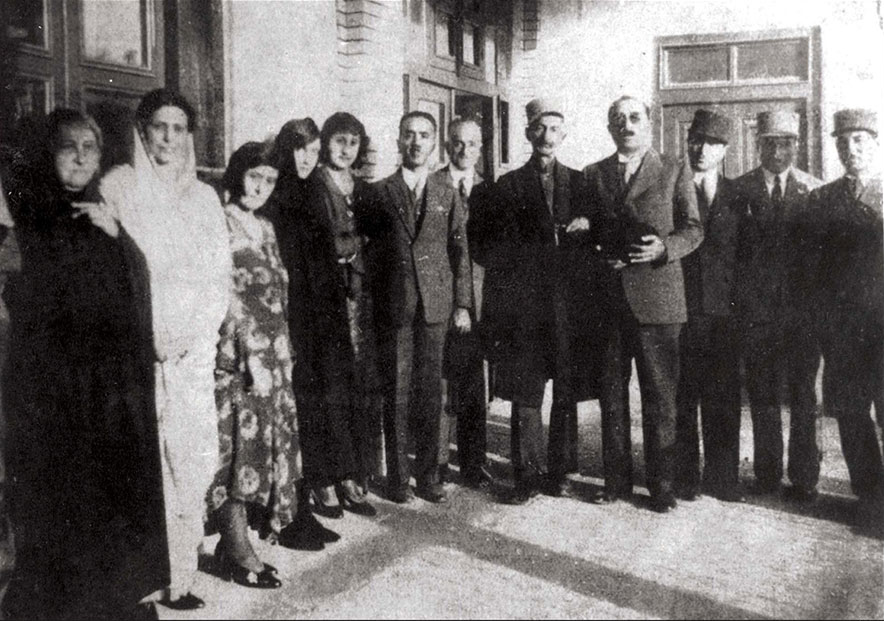
Caption: Second from right: Hasan Eqbali; Abdolhossein Sepanta; Dinshah Irani; and Aref Qazvini; Badi' al-Hokama; Jalal al-Din Keyhan (Iran's consul general in Bombay); Maryam Badi' (daughter of Badi' al-Hokama); unidentified; Monavvar Badi' (wife of Badi' al-Hokama). Photograph taken at Badi' al-Hokama's house on Beyn-ol-Nahrayn Street, Hamadan, 1932.

In 1898, Aref went to Tehran and, because he had a good voice, became acquainted with Qajar princes, including Mowthaq-od-Dowleh Maghrur Mirza and Mirza Ali-Asghar Khan Atabak, the court's grand vizier. After Mozaffar ad-Din Shah Qajar heard Aref's voice, he decided to grant him a stipend, but Aref—critical of the court—left Tehran on the pretext of inspecting his properties in Qazvin and avoided accepting the stipend.

In the years leading up to 1905–1906, as the Persian Constitutional Revolution neared victory, Aref composed poems in support of the movement that gained him popularity among the public and constitutionalists. As the movement continued, he kept writing political poetry, which became known not only in Iran but also in Turkey, Afghanistan, and Iraq.

During World War I (1914–1918), while Hassan Mostofi al-Mamalek was prime minister, the Russian army entered Iran and advanced toward Tehran despite Iran's declared neutrality. Ahmad Shah Qajar considered moving the capital from Tehran to Isfahan (a plan that was not carried out). Some politicians, reacting to the situation, went from Tehran to Qom and formed the "National Defense Committee", which was attacked by Russian forces. In 1916–1917 this group went to Kermanshah and formed an independent cabinet, headed by Nezam al-Saltaneh Mafi. Aref traveled with them to Qasr-e Shirin. Around this time, one of Aref's friends, Abdolrahim Khan, committed suicide and died; the event affected Aref deeply and he was sent to Baghdad for treatment. In 1919–1920, Aref traveled to Istanbul with a group of politicians including Mirzadeh Eshgh, Reza Ali Divan-Beigi, and Hassan Modarres.

In 1919–1920 Aref returned to Tehran. After his return, he performed concerts in Tehran. The following year, at the invitation of his friend Mohammad Taqi Pessian (head of the gendarmerie in Khorasan), he went to Mashhad and also held concerts in the city's National Garden. As before, Aref performed poems critical of the Qajar court in his concerts. The poet Iraj Mirza—himself a Qajar prince—was offended by Aref's satirical allusions to the Qajar government, and composed a long work titled Arefnameh, attacking and lampooning Aref and calling him "Aref-nama" ("pseudo-Aref"). Arefnameh became popular among Aref's opponents at the time.

In 1921, Sayyed Zia'eddin Tabatabaee was appointed prime minister, but his government fell after three months and he fled Iran. He was succeeded by Qavam os-Saltaneh. Qavam's supporters strongly denounced Zia'eddin as a traitor. Aref, who supported Zia'eddin, wrote poems in his defense and attacked Qavam, including the tasnif "O Divine Hand" (Persian: ای دست حق). In 1921–1922, Qavam ordered the killing of Mohammad Taqi Pessian; this led Aref to write several poems about him, including "A Thousand Siyâvash Live for Your Vengeance" (Persian: زنده به خون‌خواهیَت هزار سیاوش), "Don’t Tell Me Not to Cry — Crying Is My Way" (Persian: به من مگو که مکن گریه، گریه کارِ من است), and "Between One’s Head and One’s Spouse, Whoever Gives Up Themself…" (Persian: میانۀ سر و همسر، کسی که از سرِ خویش).

After a short period of frequent cabinet changes, in 1923–1924 Reza Khan Sardar Sepah was appointed prime minister. Ahmad Shah was then traveling in Europe, and Reza Khan took advantage of the situation to move against the Qajar order and promote a republic. Aref—who viewed the Qajar monarchy as a cause of Iran's misfortune and supported a republic—composed and performed tasnifs in support of Reza Khan. Among other performances, he held a crowded concert at "Teatr-e Baqerov" and performed tasnifs and ghazals including "Blood Is Like the Spring of the Water of Life" (Persian: خون چو سرچشمهٔ آبِ حیات است), "A Charming Face, Dark Hair" (Persian: رویِ دلکش، مویِ دژور), "Did You Show Mercy, O Just God — Or Not?" (Persian: رحم این خدای دادگر کردی نکردی), "So Much Injustice Was Done to the People From the Seat of Justice" (Persian: به مردم این همه بیداد شد ز مرکزِ داد), and "The Morning Breeze Will Carry the Flower’s Scent to the Nightingale" (Persian: سویِ بلبل، دمِ گل، بادِ صبا خواهد برد).

The republican project did not endure. In March–April 1924, an incident in which a deputy struck Hassan Modarres led to unrest in Tehran and a march toward the parliament; after clashes, it was decided to drop the republican debate. Reza Khan, having failed to achieve his goal via republicanism, was crowned the first shah of the Pahlavi dynasty in 1926. To consolidate control, Reza Shah curtailed political freedoms, censored newspapers, and restricted public gatherings.

These restrictions also affected Aref: he was barred from performing concerts and composing political poems, and his poetry collection—recently published in Berlin—was confiscated in Iran and its distribution prevented. Although Aref had supported Reza Khan's republican project and opposed the Qajar monarchy, Reza Shah reportedly did not have a good relationship with him. Haeri gives several reasons, including Aref's earlier support for Zia'eddin Tabatabaee, Aref's support for William Morgan Shuster (seen by Reza Shah as "support for a foreigner"), and Reza Shah's broader effort to sideline or eliminate popular figures viewed as potential threats. As a result, Aref went to Hamadan.

=== Life in Hamadan ===
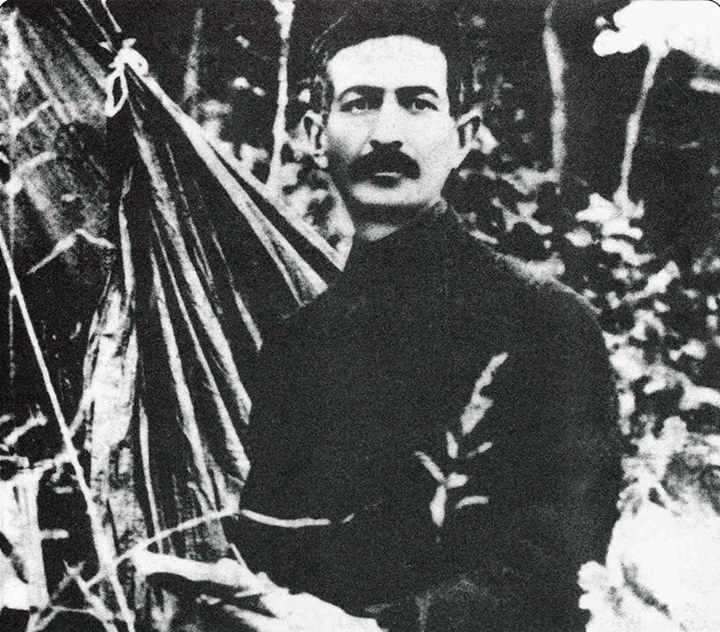
Aref Qazvini in Morad Beyg Valley, Hamadan

Some have described Aref's move to Hamadan in 1927–1928 as an "exile". For example, Abdolhossein Sepanta, who visited Aref in Hamadan on two separate trips, reported both times that Aref was "in exile". (Note: Sepanta's first trip was in 1929–1930 with Bahram Gur Anklesaria, and the second in 1932–1933 with Rabindranath Tagore and Dinshah Irani.) Moshfeq Hamadani also used the term "exile" in Khatirat-e nim-qarn rooznameh-negari when describing Aref's situation. However, Saeed Pourazimi argues that the move was not imposed by the government and was Aref's own choice. Mahmoud Badi', son of Badi' al-Hokama, likewise wrote that "no one exiled Aref; rather, Aref exiled himself", adding that Aref went to Hamadan in 1927–1928 at his father's request.

Aref had previously visited Hamadan in 1922–1923 during a trip to Kurdistan. On that trip he saw Morad Beyg Valley, became fascinated by it, and wrote about it for Badi' al-Hokama. His later journey to Hamadan was not direct. After contracting malaria in 1922–1923 and recovering under Badi' al-Hokama's medical care, Aref was again unwell when he traveled from Tehran to Borujerd in mid-June 1926; in April 1927 he accepted Badi' al-Hokama's invitation to travel to Hamadan.

In Hamadan, Aref lived in difficult conditions, having no capital and having lost his main source of income (concerts). Although one of his friends managed to secure a stipend for him from the government, it decreased over time, and Aref faced financial hardship late in life. Nevertheless, prominent figures visited him in Hamadan, including Tagore, Dinshah Irani, Ahmad Kasravi, Mohammad Ali Jamalzadeh, Vahid Dastgerdi, and Qamar-ol-Moluk Vaziri.

=== Final years ===
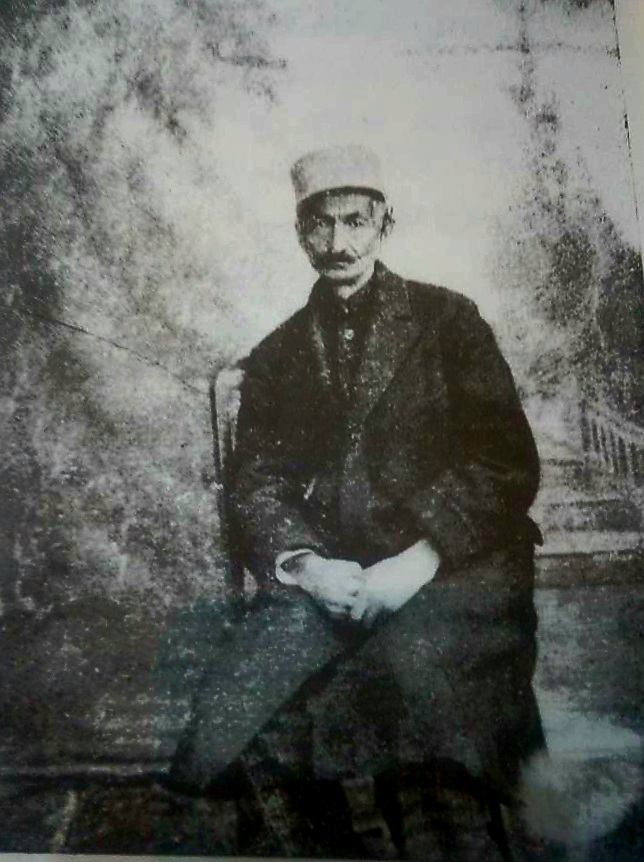
Aref Qazvini in his final days. Hamadan, 1929–1930.

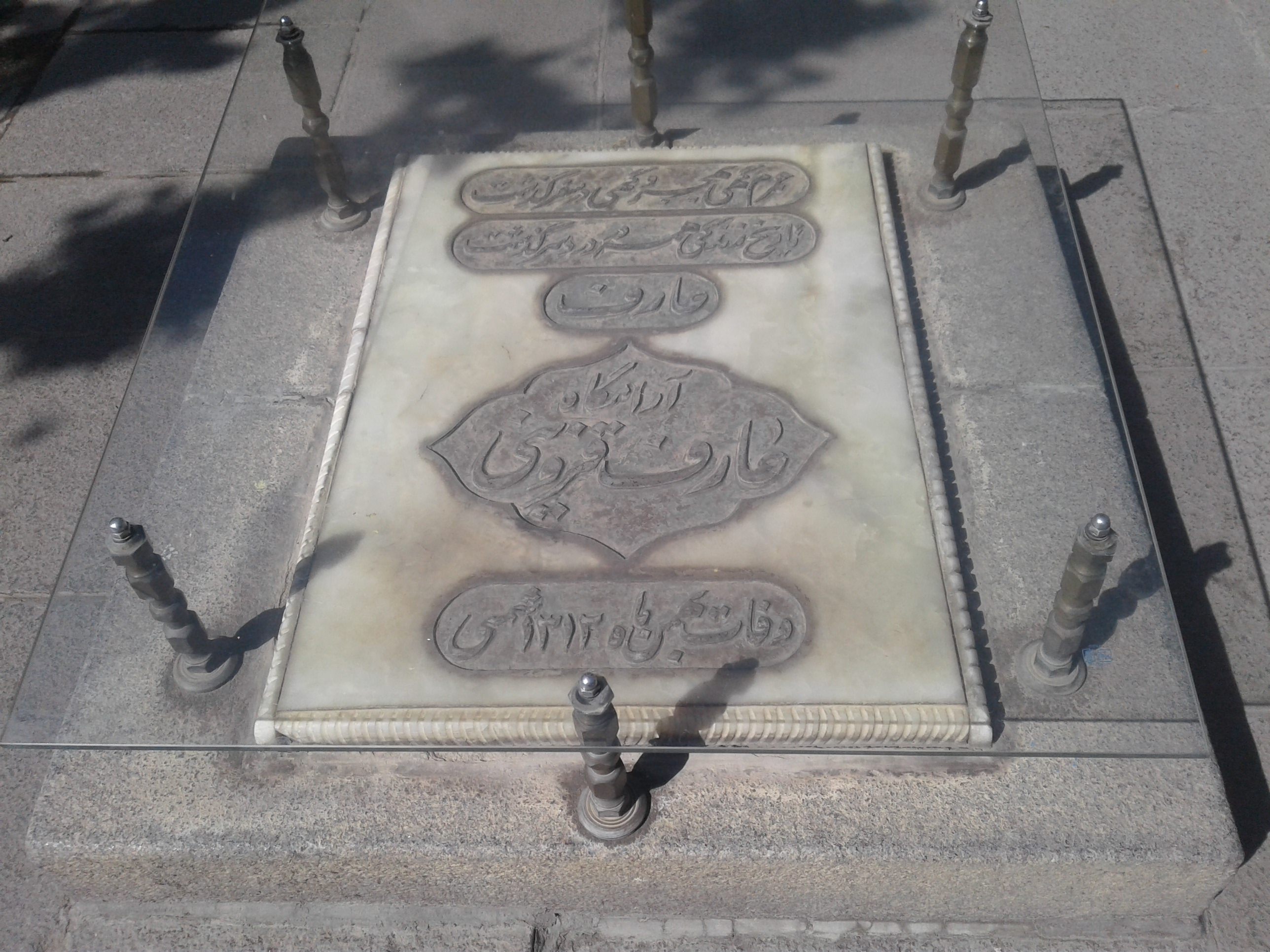
Aref's tomb

Aref spent the remainder of his life in a rented house in a small fort in Morad Beyg Valley with a servant named Jiran Khanom, (Note: Jiran had been a servant of Colonel Pessian, who entrusted her to Aref. She was Azerbaijani; her father was Nurallah and her mother Farangis; she was born in the village of "Dalameh" in the Azerbaijan region. She worked for Aref for years and later Aref contracted a temporary marriage (sigheh) with her. Jiran did not know Persian.) and his two dogs; later he lived in a house on Beyn-ol-Nahrayn Street in Hamadan. Aref described his solitary days as follows:

Now that it is the time of the sun setting on my life and the end of days in a life carelessly spent; only now have I realized that my only friends are these two dogs, in whom I have found the meaning of loyalty, affection, and friendship.

On 25 April 1926, one of Aref's dogs was poisoned. A rumor then spread that he had secretly buried the dog's body at the shrine of Emamzadeh Dehkord (near Borujerd), which provoked outrage and an attempt on his life. One of Aref's friends sheltered him in a fort for two months, and Aref was eventually forced—weak and ill—to flee from Borujerd to Arak.

In 1929–1930, Aref opened correspondence with the Indian Zoroastrians (Parsis). They sent an emissary to Hamadan to invite him to India to live in comfort, and they also undertook to cover his living expenses, but Aref declined the invitation. Aref also stated that he suffered illness due to heavy alcohol consumption. During this period he reportedly refused help from anyone, and even gave his paternal inheritance to his brothers. In 1931–1932, when Qamar-ol-Moluk Vaziri held a concert in Hamadan, Neyr-od-Dowleh presented gifts to her (including a silver vase). Qamar called Aref on stage and gave him the gifts, but Aref donated them to needy students in Hamadan and donated the vase to the Avicenna Mausoleum.

=== Illness and death ===
Aref, who had heart disease, remained in Hamadan until the end of his life. He also suffered from bronchitis due to opium use, and in his final years developed lung cancer that spread to his throat. The disease progressed to the point that he could no longer sing. Aref died around 12:30 a.m. on 20 January 1934 (or possibly in the early hours of Sunday, 21 January 1934). He was buried at the Avicenna Mausoleum. Because Aref kept dogs and drank alcohol, there were stories that a dog's body was buried with him; what is documented is that initially no one was willing to perform the funeral prayer for him, but eventually Seyyed Nasrollah Bani-Sadr did so. His burial at the Avicenna Mausoleum also faced opposition and was initially intended to be temporary. Later, in 1951–1952, while Hooshang Seyhoun was overseeing reconstruction plans for the mausoleum, Aref's remains were found and his grave was moved to the area opposite the entrance to Avicenna's tomb.

== Sources ==
- Haeri, Seyyed Hadi (1985). Aref Qazvini, National Poet of Iran (in Persian). Javidan Publications Organization.
- Arianpour, Yahya (1993). Az Saba ta Nima (in Persian). Vol. 2. Tehran: Zavar. ISBN 964-401-007-8.
- Beh-Khiyal, Mehdi (2002). "Khakestar ama Sabz". Hegmataneh (weekly) (in Persian) (242): 9–19.
- Pourazimi, Saeed (2020). "Aref Qazvini". Encyclopaedia Islamica (Great Islamic Encyclopaedia) (in Persian).
- Pourazimi, Saeed (2021). "The Myth of Aref Qazvini's Exile". Bukhara (in Persian) (142): 231–271.
- Sepanlou, Mohammad-Ali; Akhavat, Mehdi (2011). Divan-e Aref Qazvini (in Persian). Tehran: Negaah.
- Caton, Margaret (11 August 2011). "ʿĀREF QAZVĪNĪ". Encyclopedia Iranica.
