= Satenik Aghababian =

Iranian opera singer (1900–1979)

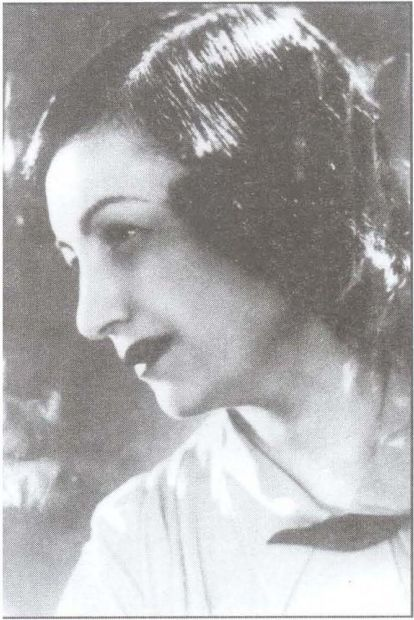
Satenik Aghababian

Satenik Aghababian (Persian: ساتنیک آقابابیان, Armenian: Սաթենիկ Աղաբաբյան) (1900–1979), also known as Satnik, Sato Peri and Pari Aghababian was an Iranian opera singer, theatre actress and playwright. She was of Armenian descent, and was one of the first Iranian opera singers. She was one of the first women to receive a formal academic education in singing. She founded a cinema for women in Tehran, called Pari for Women.
