= Mahmud Khan Malek al-Sho'ara =

Iranian poet laureate, painter, and statesman (1813–1893/94)

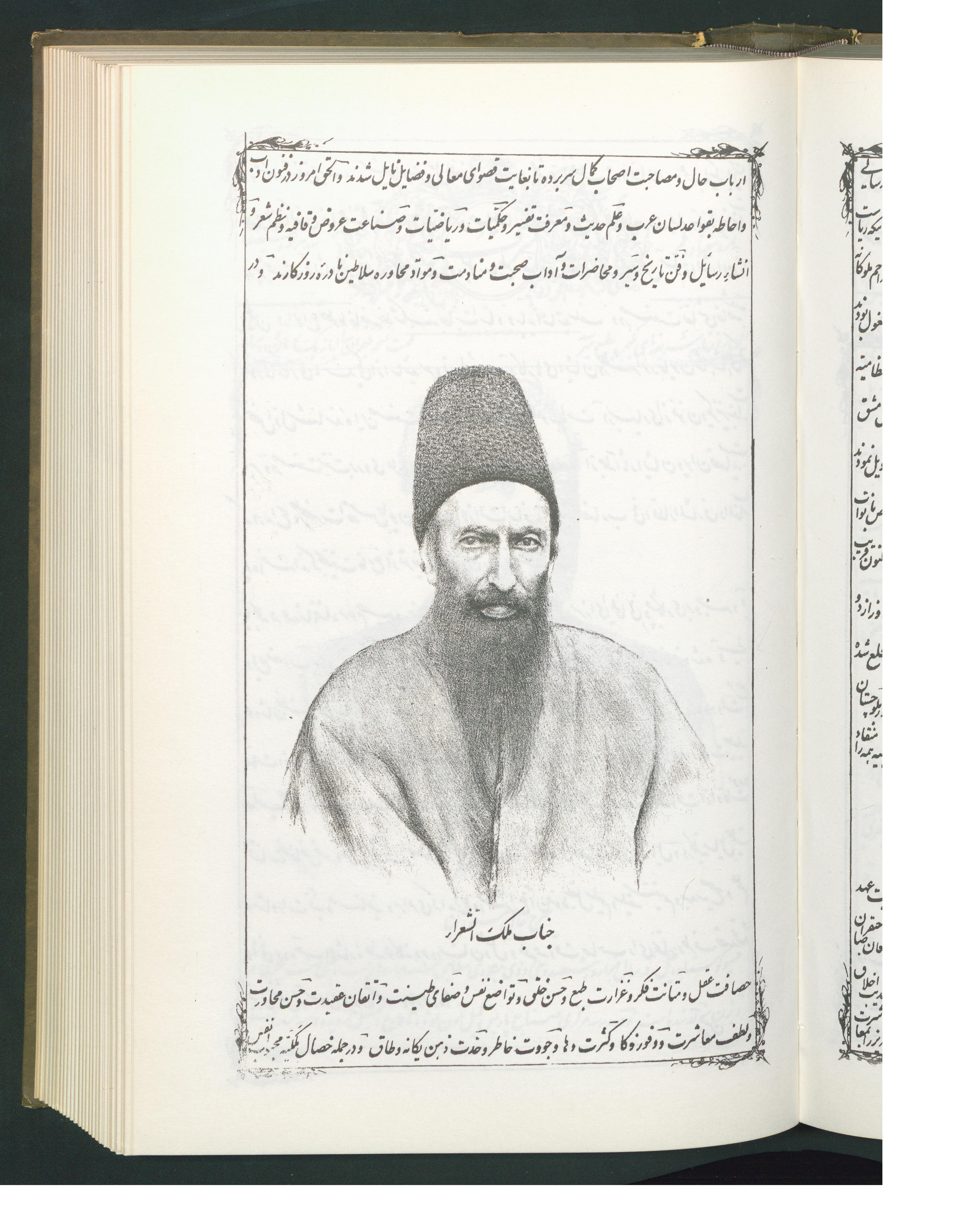
- Illustration of Mahmud Khan by Abu Torab Ghaffari
- Born: 1813; Tehran, Qajar Iran
- Died: 1893/94; Ray, Qajar Iran
- Children: Mirza Jafar Khan; Ali Hasan Khan
- Father: Andalib
- Relatives: Fath-Ali Khan Saba (grandfather)

Mahmud Khan Malek al-Sho'ara (Persian: محمودخان ملک الشعرا; 1813–1893/94) was a poet laureate, court painter and statesman in 19th-century Qajar Iran. He was the son of Andalib and grandson of Fath-Ali Khan Saba, the previous poet laureates in the Iranian court.

== Sources ==
- Floor, Willem (1999). "Art (Naqqashi) and Artists (Naqqashan) in Qajar Persia". Muqarnas. 13. Brill: 125–154. doi:10.2307/1523268. JSTOR 1523268. (registration required)
