= Morteza Mahjubi =

Iranian pianist and composer (1900–1965)

Morteza Mahjoobi

Background information
- Born: 1900; Tehran, Sublime State of Iran
- Died: 21 March 1965 (aged 65)
- Occupations: Composer, pianist
- Instrument: piano

Morteza Mahjoobi (Persian: مرتضی محجوبی; 1900 – 21 March 1965) was an Iranian pianist and composer. He was a piano soloist for the Golha radio programme.

== Early life ==
Morteza Mahjoobi (Persian: مرتضى محجوبى) was born in 1900, in Tehran, Iran. His father, Abbas Ali (Persian: عباسعلى), known as Nazer (Persian: ناظر), played the Ney. His mother, Fakhr-o-SSaadaat (Persian: فخرالسادات), played the piano. Mahjoobi's parents sent him, along with his older brother Reza, to Hossein Hang Afarin who taught Reza the violin and Morteza the piano.

At the age of ten, Morteza performed a concert accompanying Aref Qazvini in Farus Cinema (Persian: سينماى فاروس). In the following years, he went on to perform with other musicians including Darvish Khan, Seyyed Hossein Taherzadeh (Persian: سيد حسين طاهرزاده), and Hossein Esmail Zadeh (Persian: حسين اسماعيل‌زاده).

== Teachers ==
His first teacher was Hossein Hang Afarin, from whom he learned the preliminary studies. He was then sent to Mahmoud Mofakham to further his studies of the piano and radif. He also studied with other musicians, including Darvish Khan, Hossein Esmail Zadeh, Hajikhan Zarbgir, and Seyyed Hossein Taherzadeh.

== Performance style ==
Mahjoobi's performance style was improvisational. According to Navvab Safa, he never planned or prepared for his performances, and if he played a piece ten times he would play it differently each time.

== Compositions ==
Mahjoobi has composed many tasnifs (ballads), pīshdarāmads (rhythmic preludes), and rengs (rhythmic pieces). A noteworthy example is his composition "Man az Rooze Azal Divane Boodam" ("I Was Bewildered From Pre-eternity"). This tasnif has been performed by Gholam-Hossein Banan. While Mahjbi was unfamiliar with western notation, he devised a notation system similar to Siaaq (a set of symbols used in premodern times to note the weight of merchandise or monetary figures), which he used to transcribe musical ideas.

== Students ==
Mahjoobi had many students the most famous of whom is Fakhri Malekpour who studied with Mahjoobi over a period of twelve years.
