= Qamar-ol-Moluk Vaziri =

1st unveiled female Iranian singer (1905–1959)

Qamar-ol-Moluk Vaziri قمرالملوک وزیری
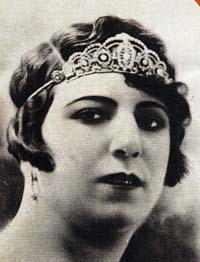
- Vaziri in the 1920s

Background information
- Born: Qamar Khanum Seyed Hosayn Khan; 1905; Takestan, Qazvin province, Qajar Iran
- Died: 5 August 1959 (aged 53–54) Shemiran, Tehran province, Pahlavi Iran
- Occupation: Singer
- Years active: 1924–1956

Qamar-ol-Moluk Vaziri (Persian: قمرالملوک وزیرى [ɢæmærolmoluːk væziːriː]; (1905 – 5 August 1959), born Qamar Khanum Seyed Hosayn Khan (Persian: قمر‌خانم سید‌حسین‌خان), commonly known as "Qamar" (Persian: قمر [ɢæmær]), was a celebrated Iranian singer, who was also the first woman of her time to sing in public in Iran without wearing a veil. She is known as "the Queen of Persian music".

Singing with the vocal range of a mezzo-soprano, she was revered for her mastery of the repertoire of Persian vocal music (radif-e âvâz), especially her sensitive rendition of tasnif and tarâna.

== Life and career ==
Qamar was born in Takestan, Iran. Her father died before she was born, and after her mother's death from typhoid fever when she was one and a half years old, she was raised by her grandmother, rowzeh-khân (singer of soaz) at the court of Naser al-Din Shah Qajar, Mollâ Khayr-ol-Nesâ' Eftekhâr-ol-Zâkerin (the latter name was bestowed on her by the king, meaning "Glory of the Narrators").

Qamar later recalled attending her grandmother's singing at the mosque, among the experiences which inspired her to become a singer.

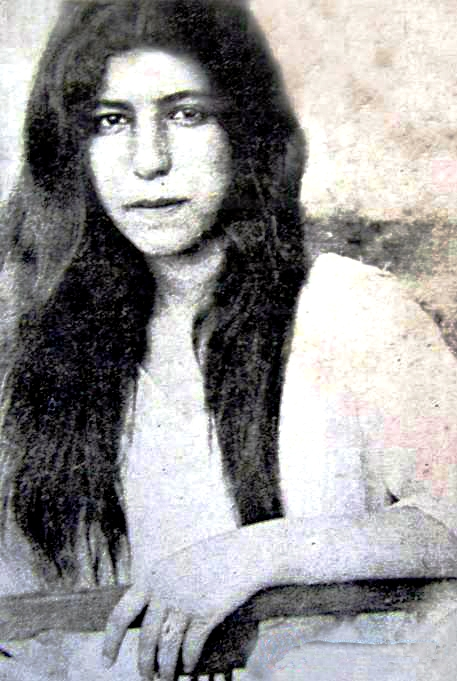
Qamar Vaziri as a teenager

She began her career in singing at age 19 in 1924 when she performed at the Grand Hotel in Tehran. When she performed she was among men and without the veil. During another performance at the Palace Theater in Tehran, again without the veil, she was accompanied by Morteza Neidavoud, who she had met when she was 16, just a few years earlier. He encouraged her to study music under his tutelage and she studied and performed in 1924. Vaziri and Neydavood worked a lot together during her 3 decade long career and in 1956 accompanied her for her farewell performance. Her existing birth certificate, issued in Tehran in 1925, legally records her first name as "Qamar-ol-Moluk" and her last name as changed from "Seyed Hosayn Khân" to "Vazirizâdeh", a name she chose for herself in honor of the musician and theoretician of music Ali-Naqi Vaziri.

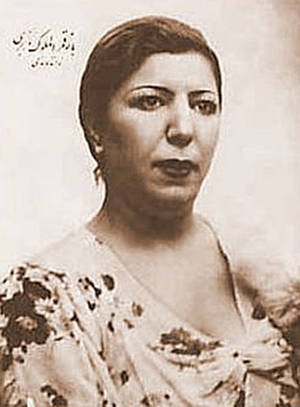
Photograph of Vaziri

Vaziri retired from singing in 1956, having worked for over 30 years with songwriters and poets in Iran, such as Morteza Neydavud, and having been recorded on several gramophone discs. She had often sung for charity and for the poor in Iran as well. She devoted her last years to philanthropic activities, as Zobeideh Jahangiri recalls them in A Moon Which Became The Sun (Persian: قمری که خورشید شد / Qamar-i Keh Xoršid Šod).

Vaziri died in 1959 in Shemiran. She is buried at Zahir-od-dowleh cemetery. Contrary to the popular belief that she died poor, she received a monthly salary of 800 tomans during the years preceding her death, which was about the salary of a high ranking university teacher.

== See also ==
- No Land's Song
- Persian women musicians
- Persian women's movement
- Varto Terian
