= Hossein Tehrāni =

Hossein Tehrāni حسین تهرانی
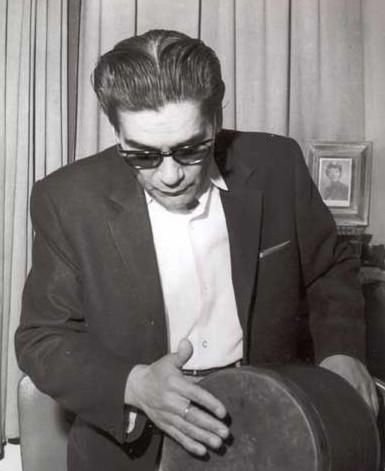

Background information
- Born: 1912; Tehran, Qajar Iran
- Died: February 26, 1974 (aged 62) Tehran, Iran
- Genre: Persian music
- Occupations: Professional musician; instructor

Hossein Tehrāni (Persian: حسین تهرانی; 1912 – February 26, 1974) was an Iranian musician and tonbak player. He is regarded as an innovator, expanding the modern tonbak into an instrument that can be played solo, in addition to its earlier role as an accompaniment instrument. Tehrāni added to the instrument's possibilities with added "beating methods" and played his instrument with different "sonorities".

== Early life ==
Tehrāni was born in Tehran, Iran. At an early age he was going to Zurkhaneh (an Iranian gymnasium) and was impressed by the big clay vase covered on open bottom with skin called Zarb Zurkhaneh. At the age of 13, Tehrāni found a similar type of Zarb Zurkhaneh in a smaller size, which was called tonbak, and began practicing by himself.

== Musical education ==
In 1928 Hossein Tehrāni became interested in studying music professionally, and took private lessons from music master and kamancheh player Hossein Khan Esmail-Zadeh. Tehrāni was keen to observe different tonbak playing styles so he attended the music classes of master tonbak players such as Reza Ravanbakhsh and Kangarlo. He wanted to learn more about Iranian traditional music, and therefore formed a relationship with the great music master and multi-instrumentalist Abolhasan Saba, from whom he learnt music theory and different aspects of Iranian traditional music.

== Albums ==
- Tombak
- World Beat
- Zard Malijeh
- Nava-ye Del
- Ava-ye Hossein Tehrani
- Ava-ye Tehrani & Saba
- Zarbkhani-ha-ye Hossein Tehrani
- Zarbahang
- Iranian Traditional Music Professors (Hossein Tehrani)
- Tonbak Training
- Yadegar-e Habib (Habib's Legacy), with Talieh Kamran, 2011

== Music career ==
Tehrāni at Shiraz Arts Festival with Faramarz Payvar & Jalil Shahnaz

In 1940 the first radio station was established in Tehran and Hossein Tehrāni was an active tonbak player accompanying musicians while performing live music programmes. He was a permanent member of the National Music Ensemble and National Music association. Tehrāni formed and organized a tonbak players ensemble with seven members and performed several pieces with his group for the first time at the Shiraz Arts Festival; the group performed several concerts in Talar Vahadat, formerly Talar Roudaki.

While playing the tonbak, Tehrāni could imitate the sound of a locomotive and a motorcycle to astonish his listeners.

=== Tutoring career ===
Hossein Tehrāni was a tonbak instructor at the College of Music and the National Music College of Tehran. Tehrāni innovated a rhythm technique, which involved the tonbak being played in harmony with the saying of Persian phrases such as baleh vo baleh, baleh digeh and yek sad-o bist-o panj.

== Literary work ==
Tehrāni wrote a book titled Amouzesh-e Tonbak (Persian: آموزش تنبک, lit. 'The Tonbak Training') about the style and practice of the tonbak.

== Resting place ==
Hossein Tehrāni is buried in the Zahir-od-dowleh cemetery, Darband, Shemiran, Tehran.
