= Tasnif =

Tasnif (Persian: تصنيف) is one of the several forms of Persian music and can be considered as the Persian equivalent of the ballad.

It is a composed song in a slow metre. As is true of other forms of musical composition, most tasnifs are of relatively recent origin and by known composers.

A large number of tasnifs were composed during the first two decades of the twentieth century. Many of them are based on patriotic themes reflecting the spirit of the constitutional movement of that period.

Tasnifs composed during the twenties and the thirties are more concerned with amorous topics and the poetry used is generally from the works of classical poets.

In the post-World War II period, the poetic context has gradually become light and the music of the tasnif has been affected by western popular songs.

This more 'modern' type of tasnif is generally called tarāne.

== See also ==
- Aref Qazvini
- Morteza Neydavoud
- Morq-e sahar
