= Mirza Abdollah =

Iranian musician (1843–1918)

- میرزا عبدالله
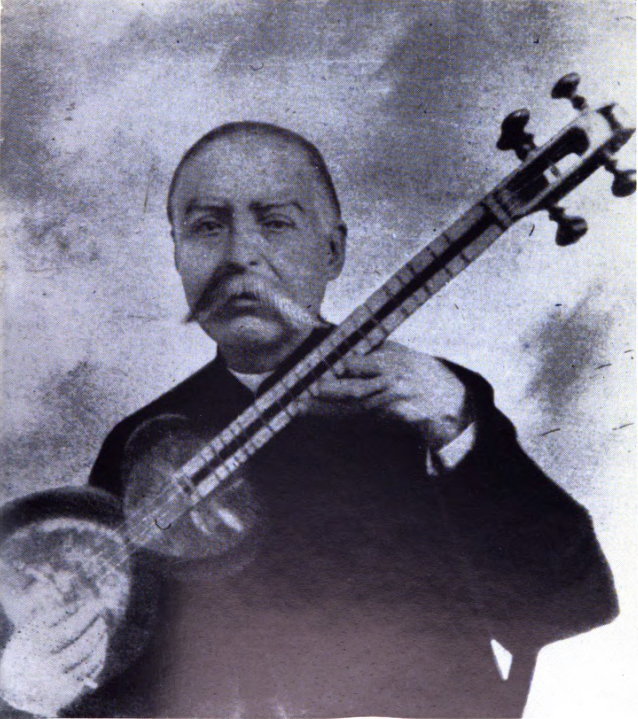
- Born: 1843; Farahan, Qajar Iran
- Died: 1918 (aged 74–75); Tehran, Qajar Iran
- Occupations: Musician, Tar and Setar player
- Known for: Radif of Persian Traditional Music
- Children: Ahmad Ebadi, Javad Ebadi
- Parent: Ali-Akbar Farahani

Mirza Abdollah, also known as Agha Mirza Abdollah Farahani (Persian: آقا میرزا عبدالله فراهانی; 1843–1918), was a tar and setar player. He is among the most significant musicians in Iran's history. Born in Farahan, he and his younger brother Mirza Hossein-Qoli started learning music from their father Ali-Akbar Farahani who was a well-known musician.

He is best known for his radif for tar and setar and for his fruitful music lessons. Abolhasan Saba, Esmaeil Ghahremani and Ali-Naqi Vaziri were among his students. Mírzá 'Abdu'lláh was one of the most influential masters of Persian classical music. Because of his desire to collect and assemble a large repertoire of traditional pieces, and because of his generosity of spirit, and his willingness to teach others, the particular rendition of Persian music he collected has become the most widely known and the most practiced among contemporary Persian musicians.

His association with the Bahá'í faith, and mystical orders, was certainly an influence on his openness, his generosity, and his desire to broaden the basis of the musical tradition, both in content and practice. His reputation for tolerance, patience, generosity, spirituality, and modesty is regarded by present-day artists as a model for the true musician. The correspondence he received from `Abdu'l-Bahá suggested the preservation and expansion of the classical musical tradition, urged the uplifting of that tradition from its preoccupation with themes of suffering, sadness and regret to those of hope, reunion, and spiritual joy, and unambiguously legitimized the musical tradition of Iran and the profession of the musician in the Bahá'í religion. Certainly in his performance, his teaching, and his transformation of the radif Mirza 'Abdu'lláh followed these exhortations and was able to greatly influence future generations of musicians. His work enabled Persian music to prosper on a strong foundation, making him a major figure in the revival of art and culture that sprang out of nineteenth century Iran.

== Notable students ==
- Darvish Khan
- Ali-Naqi Vaziri
- Ahmad Ebadi
- Abolhasan Saba

== Bibliography ==
- Blum, Stephen (2007). "ʿAbdallāh, Mīrzā". In Fleet, Kate; Krämer, Gudrun; Matringe, Denis; Nawas, John; Rowson, Everett (eds.). Encyclopaedia of Islam (3rd ed.). Brill Online. ISSN 1873-9830.
- Caton, Margaret. Baha'i Influences on Mirza Abdollah, Qajar Court Musician and Master of the Radif. In Juan Cole & Moojan Momen, "Studies in Babi and Baha'i History, Vol II: From Iran East & West," Kalimat Press, 1984, pp. 30–64.
