= Abolhasan Saba =

Iranian composer and musician (1902–1957)

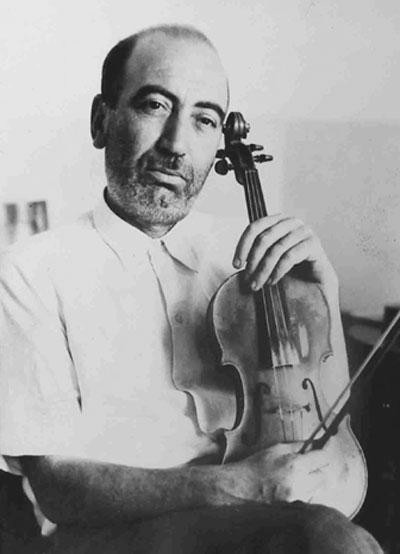

Background information
- Born: 15 April 1902
- Origin: Tehran, Iran
- Died: 19 December 1957 (aged 55)
- Genre: Persian music
- Occupation: Composer
- Instruments: Violin, setar

Abolhasan Saba (Persian: ابوالحسن صبا; 15 April 1902 – 19 December 1957) was a renowned Iranian composer, violinist, and setar player.

== Biography ==
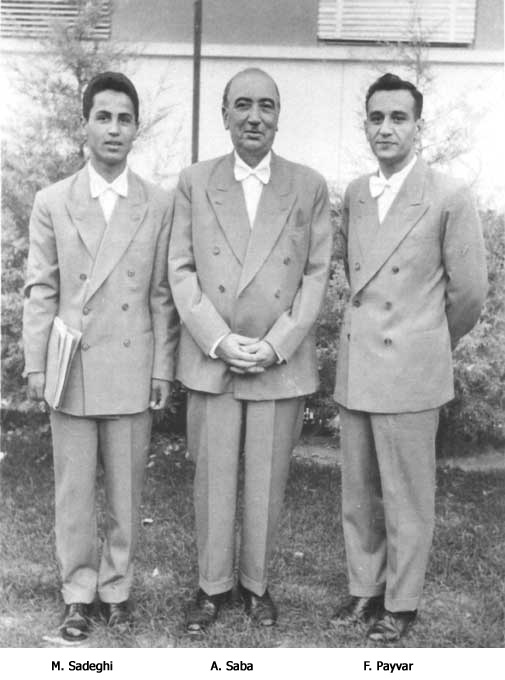
Manoochehr Sadeghi (left), Saba (middle), Faramarz Payvar (right)

He was born in Tehran to Abul Qasim Khan Kamal ol-Saltaneh, son of Mohammad Jafar Khan Sadr ol-Hekma, son of Mahmud Khan Kashi Malak ol-Shoara Sadr ol-Shoara Saba ol-Shoara, son of Mohammad Hossain Khan Malak ol-Shoara. He studied several Iranian and non-Iranic musical instruments and became an Ostad in Radif, but he selected violin and setar as his specific instruments. He was a student of Mirza Abdollah as well as Darvish Khan.

Saba is one of Iran's most influential traditional and instrumental Persian music figures. His first radio recording was in 1927 when he played violin alongside Iran's famous singer Ruhangis.

=== Notable Pupils ===
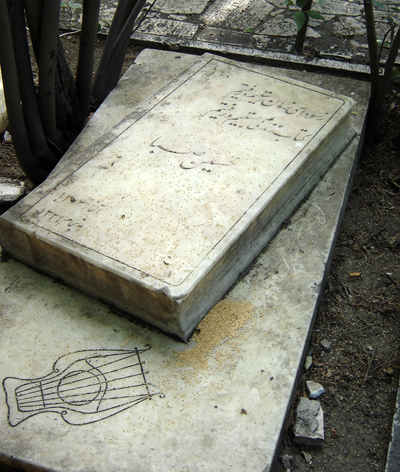
The graveside of Saba is prohibited from visitor access. His father's tomb in the same cemetery, seen here, is open to the public. The cemetery is located in Darband, Shemiran, Tehran.

Amongst his many students who went on to become great masters of Persian traditional music were Faramarz Payvar, Manoochehr Sadeghi, Habibollah Badiei, Rahmatollah Badiyi, Abbas Emadi, Ali Tajvidi, Mahmoud Tajbakhsh, Sassan Sepanta, Saeid Gharachorloo, Parviz Yahaghi, Dariush Safvat, Gholam-Hossein Banan, Parviz Tanavoli, Talieh Kamran and Hossein Tehrani.

He died in 1957 and was buried in Tehran's Zahir-od-dowleh cemetery of Artists and Musicians.

== Saba Museum ==
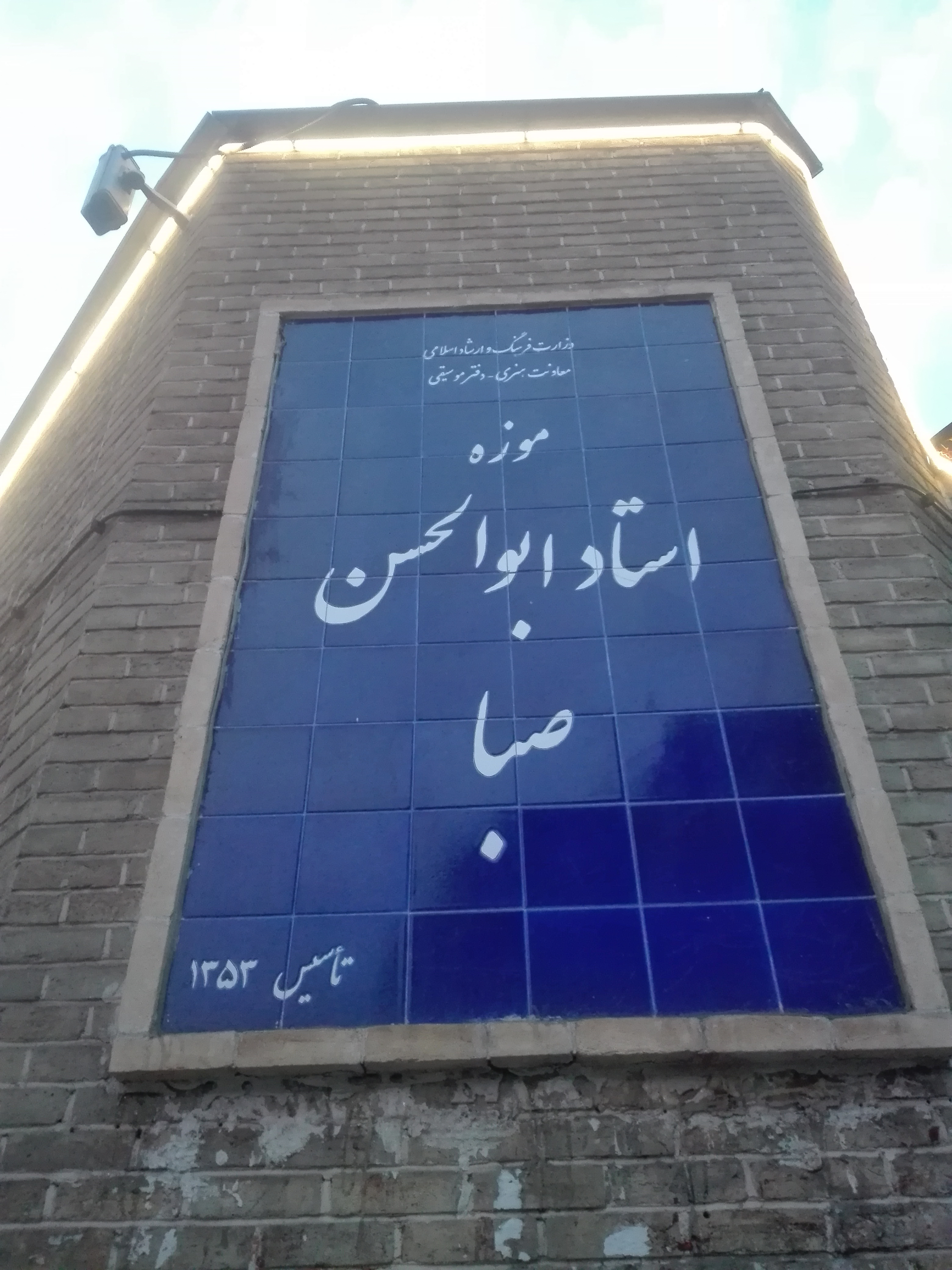
Saba Museum, Tehran.

Upon Saba's will in 1974, after his death, the faculty of Fine Arts of the University of Tehran turned his private house into a museum.

== See also ==
- Fakhereh Saba
