= Mirza Hossein-Qoli =

Iranian musician

- میرزا حسین‌قلی
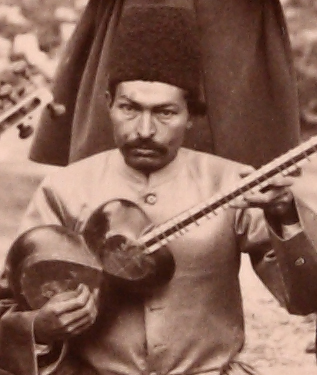
- Born: 1853; Tehran, Qajar Iran
- Died: 1916 (aged 62–63); Tehran, Qajar Iran
- Occupations: Musician; tar player
- Known for: Radif of Persian traditional music
- Children: Ali-Akbar Shahnazi, Abdolhossein Shahnazi, Zinatolmolouk Shahnazi
- Parent: Ali-Akbar Farāhāni

Mirza Hossein-Qoli (Persian: میرزا حسین‌قلی; 1853–1916), also known as Agha Mirza Hosseingholi Farahani, was a musician and tar player of the Qajar era. He and his older brother Mirza Abdollah started learning music from their father Ali-Akbar Farāhāni.

He is among the first persian musicians to record his music, in Paris, in the 1890s.

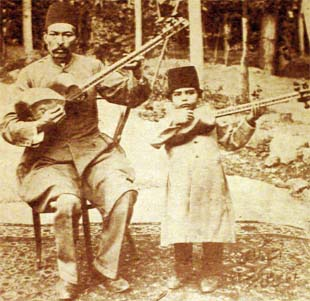
Mirza Hossein-Qoli (left) and his son Ali-Akbar Shahnazi (right)
