= Tombak =

Iranian percussion instrument

Tonbak
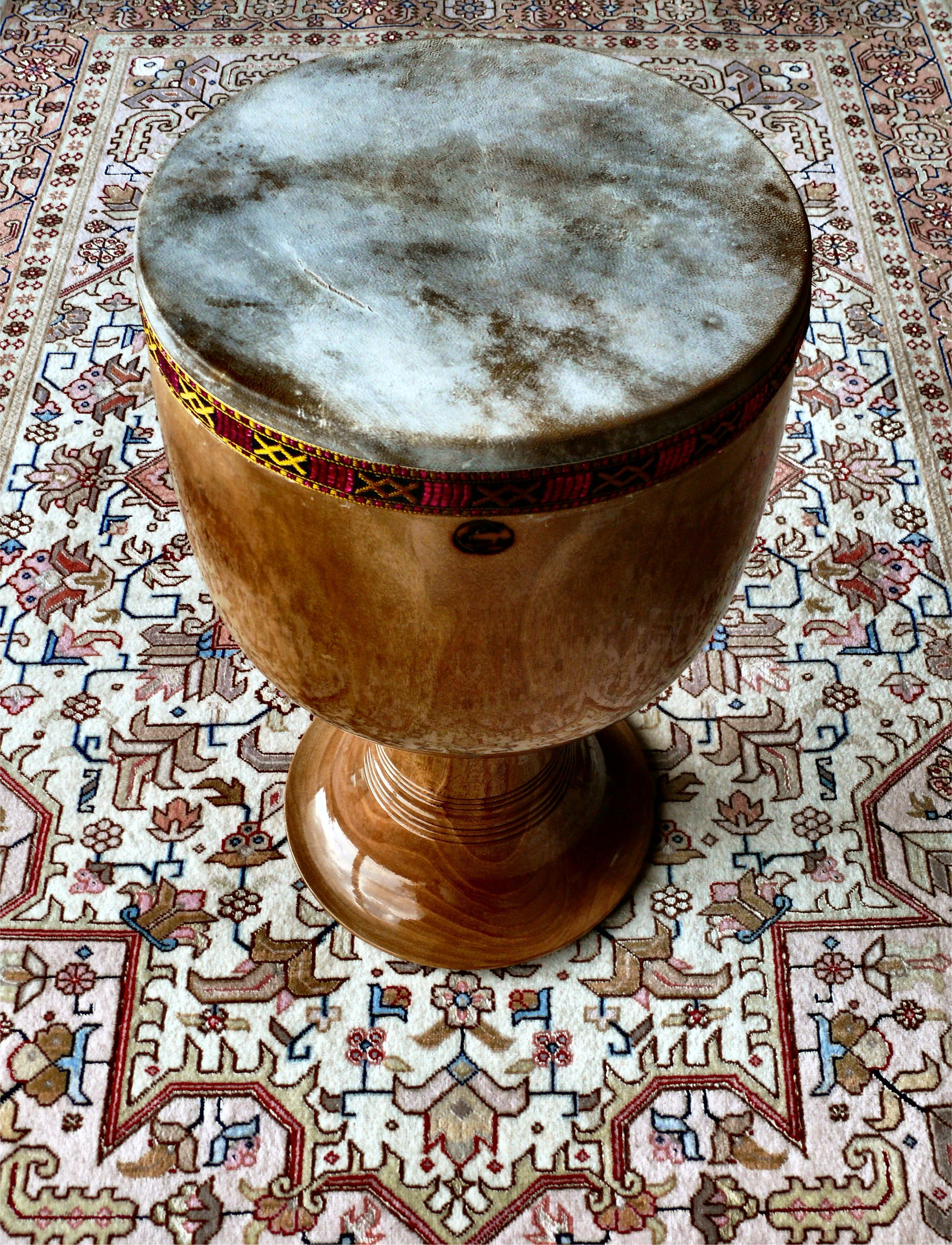
- A tombak made in Isfahan, Iran

Percussion
- Other names: Tonbak, Zarb
- Classification: Percussion

Related instruments
- Daf

Musicians
- Hossein Tehrani, Ramin Rahimi

The tombak (Persian: تمبک), tonbak (تنبک) or zarb (ضرب) is an Iranian goblet drum. It is considered the principal percussion instrument of Persian music. The tombak is normally positioned diagonally across the torso, while the player uses one or more fingers and/or the palm(s) of the hand(s) on the drumhead, often (for a ringing timbre) near the drumhead's edge. Sometimes, tombak players wear metal finger rings for an extra-percussive "click" on the drum's shell. Tombak virtuosi often perform solos lasting ten minutes or more.

== Description ==
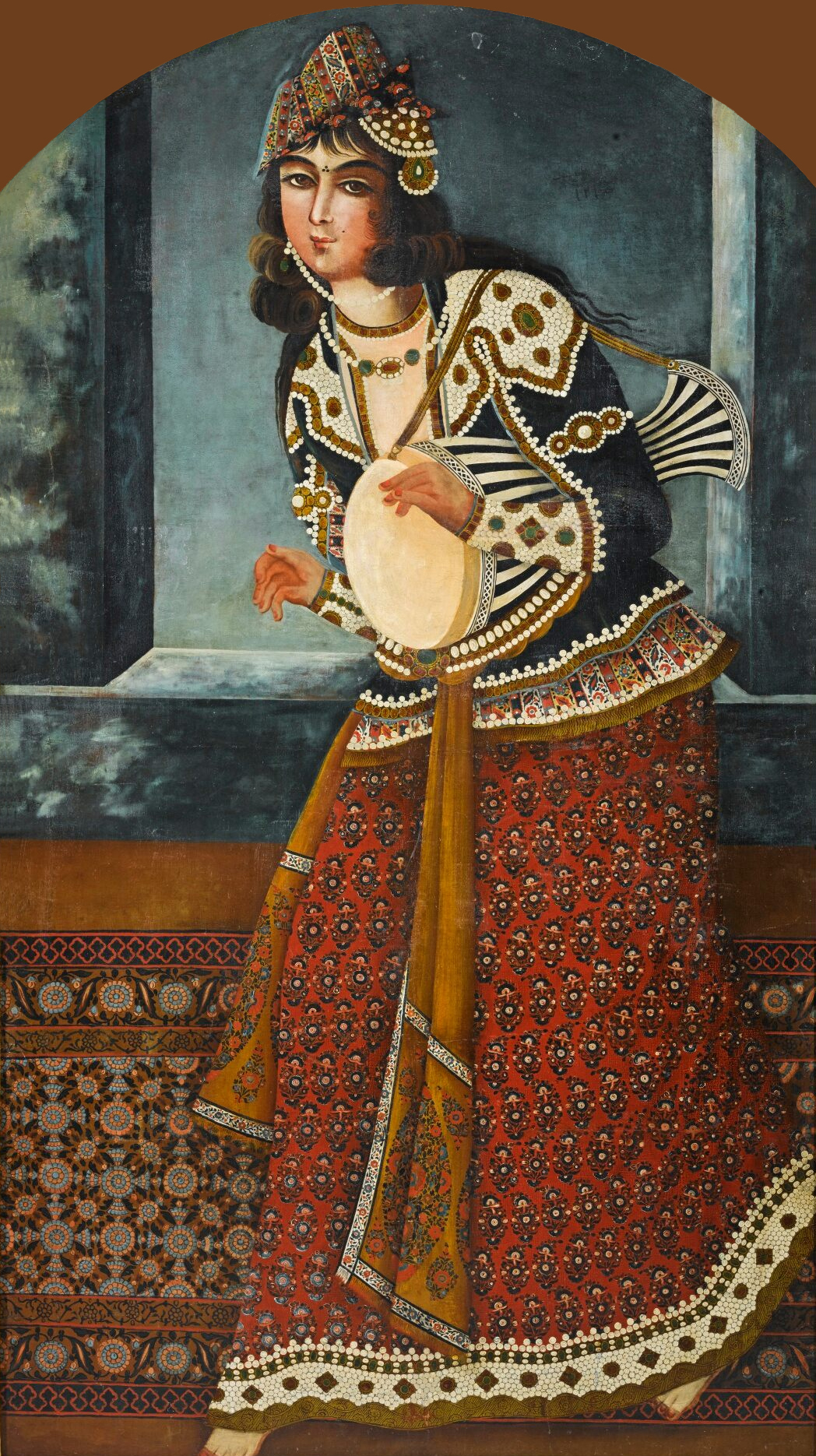
Early to mid 19th-century zarb, part of Qajar Iran

The tombak is a single-headed goblet drum is about 18 inches in height with a 28 centimetre diameter head. Its shell is carved from a single block of (sometimes highly figured, knotted or marbled) wood, maybe with a carved design or geometric pattern (such as furrows, flutes, diamonds and/or spirals—it is often a costly, heirloom-type or vintage musical instrument).

At the bottom the shell is somewhat thicker than at the top for strength (since the drumhead adds to the strength at the top). The shell's wall thickness is approximately 2 centimetres. The throat is nearly cylindrical and connects the top (body) cavity to the hollow base (the throat itself, the interior of which forms the small opening).

A sheepskin or goatskin head is stretched and secured with glue, tacks or both. The fairly wide top opening permits full bass tone as well as various treble tones (see below). Tombaks with adjustable tuning have been produced experimentally but the head tension is normally fixed prior to performance with careful attention to the temperature and humidity.

== Playing technique ==
The player may heat or cool or dampen or dry the membrane to reach a desired fundamental pitch. The pitch can be raised somewhat during a performance by applying finger pressure but a variety of tapping and clicking timbres reduce overall focus on the drum's pitch. Typically, two or three clearly contrasting timbres (through varying finger placement or clacking of a ring against the drum shell) are played in an antiphonal style.

Goblet-shaped drums are played in different regions of Asia, Eastern Europe and Africa. Although similarities exist among all goblet drums, the techniques for playing the tombak are different from most other goblet drums. The modern tombak described in this page is most closely associated with the music of Iran. The tombak was not considered a virtuoso solo instrument until the pioneering work of Hossein Tehrāni in the 1950s, as well as innovations of Nasser Farhangfar and others. Modern tombak players are exponentially expanding the techniques used in playing the instrument.

== Main performers ==
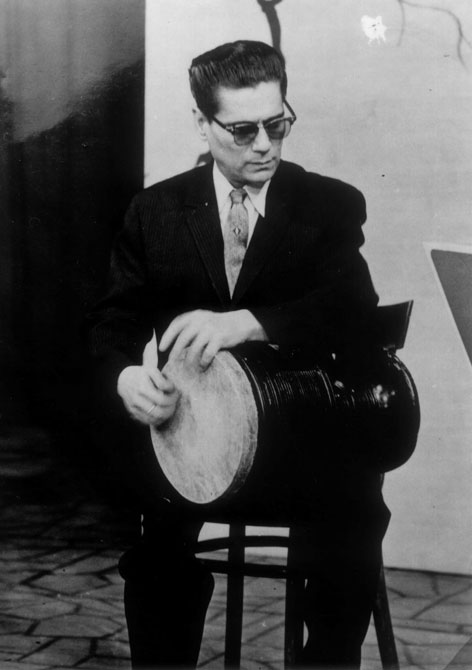
Hossein Tehrani (1912–1974) is known as a pioneer of playing the tombak in 20th century Persian music.

=== Hossein Tehrāni ===
The Tombak was considered an accompanying instrument until the pioneering work of Hossein Tehrāni in the 1950s. Tehrani added to the instrument's possibilities with added "beating methods". He also played his instrument with different "sonorities".

His pupils included Mohammad Esmaili (born 1934), Jahangir Malek (born 1931), Jamshid Chemirani (born 1942), Amir Nasser Eftetah (1925–1977) renowned teacher whose disciple Bahman Rajabi, develop modern technology.

=== Farhangfar Nasser ===
Farhangfar Nasser (1947–1997) revolutionized the principles of accompaniment, often away much of the melody without ever interfering, he drew on many styles of play of Zarb-e zourkhâné (especially that of Morshed Moradi) that accompanies Varzesh-e Pahlavani (ورزش پهلوانی), traditional martial gymnastics practiced in Zurkhaneh ("house of strength") and motrebs (popular musicians playing accents in a particular way). His knowledge of poetry and a clear and powerful voice make an improviser and especially an outstanding accompanist, always anticipating phrases soloist. Very few players assimilate his art.

=== Modern players ===
Modern players open new perspectives amount to the game of Tombak, as Madjid Khaladj, Jamshid Mohebbi, Morteza Aayan, Mohammad Akhavan, Dariush Zargari, Navid Afghah, Farbod Yadollahi, Dariush Es'haghi, Ahmad Mostanbet, Sahab Torbati, Khâvarzamini Pedram, Siamak Barghi, Pezhham Akhavass, and Pejman Haddadi.

== See also ==
- Ashiko
- Djembe
