= Radif (music) =

Collection of melodic figures in Persian music

- Stylistic origins: Oral melodic figures
- Cultural origins: Persian

Radif of Iranian music
- UNESCO Intangible Cultural Heritage
- Country: Iran
- Reference: 00279
- Region: Asia and the Pacific

Inscription history
- Inscription: 2009 (4th session)
- List: Representative

Radif (Persian: ردیف, lit. 'order') is a collection of many old melodic figures preserved through many generations by oral tradition. It organizes the melodies in a number of different tonal spaces called dastgāh. The traditional music of Iran is based on the radif, which is a collection of old melodies that have been handed down by the masters to the students through the generations. Over time, each master's own interpretation has shaped and added new melodies to this collection, which may bear the master's name.

The preservation of these melodies greatly depended on each successive generation's memory and mastery, since the interpretive origin of this music was expressed only through the oral tradition.

To learn and absorb the essence of the radif, many years of repetition and practice are required. A master of the radif must internalize it so completely to be able to perform any part of it at any given time.

The radif contains several different dastgāhs which are distinguished from each other by their relationship of note intervals and the form of the movement of the melodies within them. A dastgāh portrays a specific sonic space. A dastgāh may contain approximately 10 to 30 goushehs ("melodies"). The principal goushehs of the dastgāh specify the different scales within that dastgāh. The note, upon which the gousheh is based and often is the center of the gousheh, is called the shahed. The shahed moves when we modulate between principal goushehs, and this movement creates a new sonic space. Rhythm in these melodies takes three different forms: symmetric, asymmetric (lang), and free form. The rhythm is greatly influenced by the rhythm and meter of Persian poetry. The instrumental and vocal radif is different from the rhythmical point of view; however, their melodic structures are the same.

The radifs for tar are one of the most famous radifs associated, with many old melodies collected that include 20–40 goushehs in each dastgāh.

The radifs of Mirza Hossein-Qoli and Mirza Abdollah are the oldest radifs that are still in use for many students who wish to carry on learning Persian music. It is very famous as it consisted of many melodies collected from that time and before.

Many of the melodies were changed by Mirza Gholi and some kept same to the composer's desire, but the evidence is small to suggest melodies were changed or not, but due to radif being passed down through oral tradition (not in notation) we cannot state whether melodies were changed as we cannot compare notations or audios, but due to the mutations in music through oral transfer it is obvious.

One of the most notable tar players and repertoire of Mirza Hossien Gholi's radif was Ostad Ali-Akbar Shahnazi, who was the son of Mirza Hossien Gholi and was the first tar player to record the long radif memorized by heart. His work is still used by many Masters and are now some directions which are followed by many tar players. Of course, beginner-intermediate students will not be able to follow his works on audio due to the level at which it was performed at, so not much will be understood, but a Tar Master can expect to use it and re-focus on what was forgotten in his teachings at lesson with students. This can minimize mutations and keep the radif in line.

The radif of Mirza Abdollah was published in notation by Jean During in 1970s based on Nour Ali Boroumand, who recorded the radif by heart. On the other hand, the radif of Mirza Hossein-Qoli was first published in notation by Dariush Pirniakan in 2001. Though the radif is not popular with many young students it still is the constitute and basis of Persian music. It can be related to Classical music of western music that is not much popular, but forms the basis of Western Music.

== Definition ==
Radif is a collection of traditional melodies in Iranian music that, in various instrumental and vocal renditions, are organized with a specific order within different dastgahs and avazes (modal systems). In other words, the radif is a method for categorizing gushehs (melodic pieces) to facilitate their learning through repetition.

Radif is not merely a set of gushehs; as its name suggests, it also refers to the specific order of these gushehs. In each dastgah, the gusheh with the lowest pitch range is usually selected as the first and is called daramad (introduction), with the other gushehs following it. The gushehs have been compiled based on the taste and judgment of masters of Iranian modal music and have been arranged in the maqams (musical modes) of Iranian music in a particular sequence. According to Majid Kiani, whenever melodies and tunes (gushehs) are performed in a sequence “consistent with the artistic logic and aesthetic sensibility of Iranian culture,” along with a coordination of interval proportions, melodic movement, rhythm, and the specific embellishments of this music, the result is called radif. Each traditional music master creates a radif from the sequence of gushehs based on their own taste, thought, and emotion, and every creative performer, during its execution, gives birth to a new radif founded upon solo performance and improvisation.

== History ==
=== Background ===
Before the transformation from maqam to dastgah, Iranian music was taught using the system of maqams. After this transformation, the melodic pieces (gushehs) were also categorized under the seven dastgahs, and some of the maqams were preserved in the form of gushehs. The beginning of the separation of Iranian music from the maqam-based method likely dates back to the Timurid period (14th–15th centuries CE). However, there is disagreement regarding the exact method of music education during this period. Raphael Kiesewetter believes that the formation of the radif took place during this time, with the goal of teaching the components of Iranian music individually. Bruno Nettl also asserts that the history of radif goes back at least to the 18th century.

In contrast, Dariush Talai argues that the systematic ordering of Iranian melodies into a radif began only in the 13th century of the Iranian calendar (equivalent to the 19th century CE). In any case, there is a consensus among theorists that the purpose of creating radifs was to make it easier to teach the dastgahs, avazes, and gushehs of Iranian music, and that the method of instruction required students to memorize all the melodies.[ Meanwhile, Hormoz Farhat speculates that this transformation resulted from a decline in the skills of musicians during the Safavid era, to the point that they were no longer capable of composing or improvising within a single maqam or fixed scale. As a result, they began to combine gushehs from various maqams, leading to the necessity of teaching and categorizing these gushehs separately within a dastgah—even when those gushehs did not share a common scale.

From the perspective of Walter Feldman, a prominent scholar of Ottoman music, while Turkish music focused on developing its theoretical foundations (through expanding maqams), Iranian music moved toward formalization (emphasizing musical structure). Vocal music came to dominate over instrumental music in Iran, and maqams (and later dastgahs) were broken into smaller segments that could each be taught independently—giving rise to the radif of Iranian music. On the other hand, some researchers link the formation of radif in Iran to the increasing influence of Western culture during the Qajar period.

According to Bruno Nettl, the formation of the Iranian radif in the 20th century is connected to the nationalist movements of that time and represents an attempt by Iranians to assert the independence of their music from Turkish and Arab traditions, which share common roots. Dariush Talai also contends that the primary goal of the founders of the radif was to compile a coherent and systematic collection of traditional melodies; they were not necessarily concerned with organizing a modal system. Therefore, the relationship between the radif and musical modes (maqams) remains undefined, and the pedagogical system of the radif does not embody any explanatory theory.

Although the transformation from maqam to dastgah gradually occurred from the mid-Safavid era to the late Qajar period, the term radif only came into use during the late Qajar era and is absent in earlier manuscripts. For instance, the book Bahrol-Alhan, written in the Qajar era and one of the first works addressing dastgahi music, names the seven dastgahs and their associated gushehs in detail, but does not use the term radif.

=== Formation of the Radif ===
The formation of the radif is generally attributed to Ali Akbar Farahani. Farahani was a masterful musician in the court of Naser al-Din Shah Qajar who, due to his privileged position and his commitment to preserving Iranian music (despite the cultural decline of his era), undertook the task of classifying Iranian music. Although Farahani's original radif has not survived, its influence can be found in all subsequent radifs, particularly those transmitted through his sons, Mirza Abdollah and Agha Hosseinqoli.

Mirza Abdollah and Agha Hosseinqoli were both prominent tar players during the Qajar period, dedicating their lives to compiling and teaching their respective radifs. Among them, Mirza Abdollah's radif is considered the most important, as he transmitted it to numerous students, thereby keeping the artistic legacy of the pre-Qajar era alive to this day.

In addition to these two brothers, some sources also mention Mohammad Sadeq Khan (a musician at Naser al-Din Shah's court) as one of the earliest figures to perform the radif. The creation of the first tasnifs (composed pieces) based on the radif is also attributed to women of the royal court, including Soltan Khanom (a court musician) and Taj al-Saltaneh (a royal princess).

=== Publication and Dissemination ===
The dissemination of the radif (repertoire) of Iranian music beyond the royal court is attributed to Darvish Khan. He served under Prince Malek Mansour Mirza Shoa‘ al-Saltaneh at the Qajar court. After being threatened with having his hands cut off for performing music in front of people outside the prince's court, he fled and sought refuge at the British Embassy. Eventually, with the embassy's mediation, he was released from the Qajar court. He then performed music publicly in Tehran and earned his living this way.

In the early 19th century, the feudal system gradually receded from Iranian music, and musicians increasingly performed in public, financially independent from the royal court. During this period, Ali Khan Zahir al-Dowleh founded the Anjoman-e Okhovat (Brotherhood Society), which included many renowned musicians of the time. They regularly performed at the society's events.

The society, rooted in Sufi gatherings dating back to the time of Safi-Ali Shah, held weekly ceremonies every Thursday, which were also attended by princes and court officials. As a result, musicians of the era found themselves seated alongside those who had once been their patrons. The Brotherhood Society took advantage of this social convergence and organized what is known as the first public concert of radif music. The concert took place in a northern Tehran park in celebration of the birth anniversary of Ali ibn Abi Talib. Tickets were priced at 30 tomans for those who could afford them, while others could attend for free.

Subsequent concerts organized by the Brotherhood Society had charitable purposes, supporting causes such as aid for the injured in the Tehran bazaar fire, raising funds to restore Ferdowsi’s mausoleum, and celebrating the opening of Rasht’s new city hall.

=== Transmission and Modern Evolution of the Radif ===
At the time of their creation, radifs were transmitted orally just like in the pre-radif era. [26] Some radif masters would appoint their best students as their khalifeh (successor), assigning them to oversee the learning process of other students. For example, Morteza Neydavoud was the khalifeh of Darvish Khan, and after other students received instruction from Darvish Khan, they would go to the adjacent room to review the lessons with Neydavoud.

Most radif masters had themselves learned music from several earlier radif masters. For example, Nour-Ali Borumand studied the radif with Darvish Khan, Mussa Ma’rufi, and Esma’il Ghahremani. As a result, these students would often combine the radifs they had learned from various teachers to create their own versions, which they then taught to the next generation. This blending of oral transmission and the merging of radifs meant that the concept of the radif in Iranian music was never entirely fixed or uniform.

This pattern changed somewhat when radifs began to be recorded—either in writing or on audio. From the 1970s (1350s in the Iranian calendar), the radifs of masters such as Ali Akbar Khan Shahnazi, Nour-Ali Borumand, Sa’id Hormozi, Youssef Foroutan, Abdollah Davami, and Mahmoud Karimi were recorded on cassette tapes and have been preserved to this day.

The first written transcription of a radif was done by Ali-Naqi Vaziri in the late 1910s (1290s in the Iranian calendar). Vaziri transcribed the radif of four dastgahs (modal systems), which he had learned from Agha Hosseinqoli and his son Ali Akbar Shahnazi. Vaziri was also the first to formulate a theoretical system for Iranian music.

Although the growth of traditional Iranian music in the contemporary era has mostly taken place in Iran, it has not been confined to Iran. In the 1960s, most instrument makers in Iran were Armenians, and many of the musicians and singers were Jewish. Between 1948 and 1970, around 70,000 Jews emigrated from Iran to Israel, and from the mid-1970s onward, more of the remaining Jews left for Israel, North America, and Europe. With them, the radif of Iranian music was also taken abroad.

However, most traditional music audiences in Iran were Muslims, and the Jewish community in Iran was more inclined toward Western music. For this reason, some prominent Jewish singers—such as Younes Dardashti—who were unable to establish successful careers or large audiences in Israel, eventually returned to Iran to produce music or give concerts.

In the United States, before the 1970s, knowledge of Iranian music was mostly limited to academics. The field of Iranian music in the U.S. was confined to universities with ethnomusicology departments and the very small Iranian-American community at the time. However, starting in the mid-1970s, with a significant wave of Iranian immigration to the U.S., several hundred thousand Iranians settled in cities like Los Angeles, San Francisco, Houston, and New York. Some, especially from the middle and upper classes, also settled in academic cities such as Chicago and Indianapolis.

Hormoz Farhat argues that during this period, it was difficult to make a living as a musician in Iran. Conversely, some Iranians who had previously paid little attention to traditional music began to support it after immigrating to the U.S.—by performing it at Iranian-American gatherings, selling traditional Iranian music on cassette and CD, and even authoring and publishing books about Iranian music.

=== Transformations ===
The content of the radif has undergone changes over time. For instance, Bruno Nettl, by examining two versions of Mahmoud Karimi's vocal radif—one recorded and documented independently by one of Karimi's students in the 1960s, and another recorded independently with Karimi himself in the late 1970s—assessed the degree of stability in the radif throughout history. He concluded that while musical content in the radif has changed very little, changes in the naming of gushehs (melodic pieces) are not uncommon. A similar situation existed with the radif of Nour-Ali Borumand. Nettl, by comparing versions recorded in different years, found that the degree of variation in Borumand's radif was greater than in Karimi's.

Additionally, radifs developed in different regions of Iran also differ from one another. Hajarian identifies at least four major radifs: the Isfahan radif, Shiraz radif, Qazvin radif, and Tehran radif—all cities that were capitals of Iran at some point. He notes that each of these traditions has its own distinguished masters (for example, he names Hassan Kassai as a representative of the Isfahan school). He also compares the radifs of Mirza Abdollah, Kassai, and Karimi, showing that the number and names of the gushehs in the avaz of Abu Ata differ among them (7 gushehs including one daramad in Mirza Abdollah's, 21 gushehs including six daramads in Kassai's, and 9 gushehs including one daramad in Karimi's). However, once duplicate, similar, or non-essential items are removed, the core gushehs in all three radifs are the same: Daramad, Gabri, and Hejaz.

=== Registration with UNESCO ===
In October 2009, the radif of traditional Iranian music was inscribed on UNESCO’s Representative List of the Intangible Cultural Heritage of Humanity. Seyed Mohammad Mousavi, the director of the Mahoor Cultural and Artistic Institute, expressed regret that the Ministry of Culture and Islamic Guidance (the main authority for music in Iran) played no role in this achievement. According to him, the idea of registering the radif with UNESCO was first proposed by Houman Asadi, who ultimately also managed its implementation. Asadi initially presented the idea to the Iranian House of Music, but since UNESCO required both a short and a feature-length documentary film about the radif and the House of Music lacked the necessary budget, the proposal was not pursued. Eventually, the Cultural Heritage Organization agreed to fund the project, and Asadi both supervised the film production and prepared the necessary academic reports for UNESCO. Mousavi described the fact that the radif was registered years after the inscription of the "Six Maqams" of Tajikistan and the "Mugham" of Azerbaijan as "painful."

=== Shared and Distinct Features of the Gushehs ===
Apart from the Daramad and Forud, which are found in almost all Dastgahs (although each Dastgah has its own distinct Daramad and Forud), there are other Gushehs that appear in several Dastgahs. For example, the Gusheh of Kereshmeh exists in all Dastgahs, Zanguleh appears in six Dastgahs, and Jame-daran is mentioned in four Dastgahs. Hormoz Farhat uses the term "fragment" (tekkeh) to describe minor Gushehs that are performed across multiple Dastgahs and are sometimes not performed at all. However, Bruno Nettl writes that even among these fragments, there are differences in terms of how many Dastgahs they appear in, and he critiques Farhat for not categorizing other short Gushehs—such as Nahib, which are also found across different Dastgahs—as tekkeh.

Gushehs also differ in terms of length (i.e., the duration they are allocated during Radif performance); some Gushehs are typically played within ten to twenty seconds, while others may take three to five minutes to perform. For instance, in the Dastgah of Shur, the Gushehs of Salmak, Razavi, and Shahnaz are longer across all Radifs, while Zirkesh-e Salmak and Golriz are shorter. In some Radifs, longer Gushehs are divided into several "sections" (ghesmat), each of which is taught and explained separately. These sections usually follow a specific order and are all used during a complete performance; although they share a similar framework, small structural differences allow them to be distinguished from one another.

Conversely, there are Gushehs that are performed in more than one form within the same Dastgah. These different forms are called "types" (no‘). Gushehs with multiple types provide the performer with more freedom and open up space for improvisation. For example, most Dastgahs have more than one Daramad (for instance, in Boroumand's Radif, four different Daramads are introduced for both the Shur and Chahargah Dastgahs).

There are many Gushehs that are mentioned in more than one Dastgah; this includes Gushehs that are performed identically across different Dastgahs but bear different names, as well as Gushehs that share the same name but differ in performance (e.g., rhythmically or in terms of intervals between notes), and also Gushehs that have the same name and similar performance. For example, in his analysis of the Radif of Javad Maroufi, Bruno Nettl identifies 152 Gushehs (this includes Daramads, but excludes structures smaller than a Gusheh and Chaharmezrabs); among them, 45 Gushehs appear in more than one Dastgah. The number of shared Gushehs in the Dastgahs of Nava and Rast Panjgah is 12 and 19, respectively. However, some scholars consider these Dastgahs largely to be collections of borrowed material from other Dastgahs. The number of shared Gushehs is 14 in Homayoun and 12 in Mahour, while in the Shur family, the number is smaller (7 in Shur, 4 in Abu Ata, 4 in Afshari, 3 in Bayat-e Tork, and none in Dashti).

Nettl also examines the vocal Radif of Abdollah Davami in this regard. This Radif, which contains a total of 92 Gushehs, includes 25 Gushehs that appear in more than one Dastgah. Nettl finds the general pattern of these overlaps similar to the pattern observed in Maroufi's Radif. Overlaps between Dastgahs considered to be of lesser importance (such as Nava and Rast Panjgah) are greater, while Dastgah-e Shur, which is considered by many to be the most important Dastgah in Iranian Radif music, has fewer overlaps with other Dastgahs.

=== Modulation ===
Pardeh-gardani, or modulation, refers to the transition from one Dastgah to another. In Iranian music, some Gushehs within each Dastgah have the potential to facilitate modulation to another Dastgah. For example, in the Dastgah of Mahur, the Gusheh Delkash (in which the sixth and seventh degrees are lowered), or in Chahargah, the Gusheh Hesar (where the fourth degree is lowered and the fifth is raised), and also the Gusheh Mouyeh (with a lowered fourth degree), have such characteristics. Gushehs that enable modulation are usually long, and performers (both instrumentalists and vocalists) regard them as important Gushehs. These Gushehs typically do not appear at the beginning or end of a Dastgah, but rather in its middle sections.

The number of Gushehs with modulatory potential varies from one Dastgah to another. For instance, in Chahargah, only Hesar and Mouyeh effectively have this capability, whereas in Mahur, out of the 58 Gushehs listed in the Radif of Javad Maroufi, 23 Gushehs have scale degrees different from those of Mahur’s main scale (which resembles the Western major scale) and are capable of modulation. These include Delkash, Shekasteh, Hajji Hasani, Tarab-angiz, Neyriz, Sorush, Iraq, Mohayyer, Basteh-Negar, all members of the Rak family (such as Rak-e Hindi, Rak-e Kashmir, etc.), Sufi-nameh, and Harbi.

Bruno Nettl, citing other researchers, has shown that Gushehs capable of modulation have attracted more attention in the past century, to the extent that some are now performed independently from the Dastgah they originally belonged to and are gradually evolving into separate Dastgahs. One such example is Bayat-e Kord (derived from the Dastgah of Shur, with a raised fifth degree by a semitone). Other scholars, including Jean During and Hormoz Farhat, have also acknowledged this trend of the emergence of new Dastgahs.

=== Rhythm ===
Most Gushehs do not have a defined rhythmic structure, and the Radif as a whole is not centered around rhythm. However, some Gushehs (such as Rengs or Chaharmezrabs) are known for their distinctive rhythmic patterns. For this reason, some experts have questioned whether these Gushehs actually belong in the Radif repertoire. These pieces are usually referred to as Zarbi (rhythmic). The rhythmic pattern of vocal Radifs is based on the meter of Persian and Arabic poetry, but in instrumental performances, other rhythmic patterns can also be found.

Gushehs with more defined rhythms typically play a more minor role in the Radif. For example, the Gusheh Kereshmeh is usually performed after a non-rhythmic Gusheh and borrows its characteristics to blend them with its own distinct rhythm. The same applies to the Gusheh Naghmeh, which is typically performed with a pulsating pattern between two or more notes. Hormoz Farhat categorizes these Gushehs under the concept of Teke (fragment or section).

=== Instrumental and Vocal Radifs ===
In addition to rhythmic differences, instrumental and vocal Radifs differ in other ways as well. The absence of poetry in instrumental Radifs provides more flexibility for the performer; therefore, some Gushehs are only found in instrumental Radifs and are not performed vocally—examples include Basteh-Negar, Majles-Afrouz, Khosravani, and Tarab-Angiz. Additionally, Chaharmezrabs and Rengs are exclusively instrumental and are not accompanied by singing.

As a result, in modern times, instrumental and vocal Radifs are sometimes discussed separately. However, the use of the term Radif in relation to vocal music is more recent than its use for instrumental music—though this may be due to the fact that Radif instruction originally began with instruments like the Tar and Setar before it was taught through vocal practice.

=== Reflection of Iranian Culture ===
Bruno Nettl views the Radif of Iranian music as a cultural artifact whose structure and components reflect the culture of Iran at the time the Radif was formed (that is, the late 19th century and the first half of the 20th century). He lists some of the most important cultural characteristics of Iranians that may have influenced the Radif of Iranian music as follows:

- Class system: People obey their king/leader, university professors respect the dean, and families are patriarchal.
- Individualism: Imitation is not admired; being different is valued.
- Etiquette (Taarof): In informal matters, the principal person or the first speaker takes precedence, but the more formal the situation, the more the main speakers are deferred to the end, and the principal spokesperson is usually the last to speak.

According to Nettl, these elements are also seen in the Radif of Iranian music. The class system is visible both in the structure of the Radif (for example, the Homayoun Dastgah is always presented before its related modes like the Bayat-e Esfahan vocal mode, or the Daramad [opening section] of each Dastgah acts as the fundamental and defining element of the rest of the mode) and in the way the Radif is taught (teachers assign higher status in the hierarchical class structure of the Radif to "main" Radifs like the Mirza Abdollah Radif, although they also acknowledge that every part of the Radif is capable of innovation) [۸۶].

Individualism in the Radif manifests in the fact that, while on one hand the Radif is said to be a complete collection encompassing all Iranian music, on the other hand the delicacy and beauty of Iranian music lies in performing the modal music in a unique and novel way. (Nettl recalls an example given by Nourali Bromand describing traditional Iranian music as like the song of the nightingale—each nightingale's song is unique.) Also, although music education begins with repeating existing Radifs, improvisation is considered an important part of mastery in Iranian music.

Regarding etiquette in Radif performance, Nettl notes that in informal gatherings (such as when he himself played music with someone else in the bazaar), he could perform first, but in formal ceremonies, respect for the master was maintained and the masters were given priority in the performance order.

=== Recording and Documentation of the Radif ===
According to Bruno Nettl, the oldest existing recorded Radif was compiled by Musa Ma'rufi and published in 1963. This Radif was prepared in response to a government order and, after publication, was regarded by many students as the most authoritative version. It included 470 goushehs (melodic units), some of which were repeated across different dastgahs (modal systems).

In the 1970s, two more Radifs were recorded by the Ministry of Culture: Ali Akbar Shahnazi’s Radif for the tar, and Abdollah Davami’s Radif for vocal performance. Another Radif was also recorded by Radio Iran—Morteza Neydavoud’s Radif for the tar. However, recordings of Radif masters existed prior to this as well. For example, in 1905 (1284 in the Iranian calendar), Agha Hosseinqoli was the first to record pieces on gramophone discs; he recorded music again in two later periods: in Paris in 1907 (1286 SH), and in Tehran in 1912 (1291 SH). [93]

Other sources attribute the first gramophone recordings of music to 1906–1907, when the European "Gramophone and Typewriter Company," invited by Mozaffar ad-Din Shah, came to Iran to record performances by Ali Khan Nayeb os-Saltaneh and some other court musicians. [94] Between 1912 and 1915, more gramophone discs were recorded, including vocal performances by Eqbāl os-Saltaneh Abdollah Khan Davami. Davami, who was not a court musician, is known for having brought the Radif into the realm of vocal performance.

Another impact of recording the Radif was that, for the first time, Radif masters were able to hear their own instrumental or vocal performances and work on improving them. A notable early example of this is Hossein Taherzadeh, who taught himself vocal technique by repeatedly recording and listening to his own voice on gramophone records.

The written documentation of the Radif also began in the late 19th and early 20th centuries. The first individuals to engage in this effort were Mehdi-Qoli Hedayat (a Qajar-era minister), Ali-Naqi Vaziri (an army officer), and Alfred Jean-Baptiste Lemaire (a French teacher at the Dār al-Fonūn school). Of these, only parts of Lemaire’s notations of the Radif have survived.

Gholamreza Minbashian also transcribed Mirza Abdollah’s Radif around 1911, though this version has been lost. In 1914, a poet from Shiraz named Forsat od-Dowleh, who had spent some time in the Qajar court in Tehran, published the first book on the Iranian Radif—Bohoor al-Alhan—in Bombay. This was the first work to catalogue all the melodies of the Radif. The Radif in this book was organized into seven dastgahs, and some goushehs were labeled as "new" or "recent," meaning they originated during the Qajar period rather than earlier. Forsat od-Dowleh also called the possibility of documenting the Radif in written form the most important development in Iranian music education.

However, Mohsen Hajarian attributes the beginning of systematic written notation of the Radif to the 1920s. Additionally, Jean During transcribed Mehdi-Qoli Hedayat’s Radif into Western notation in 1976 (1355 SH); although its official publication was delayed until 1991 (1370 SH), photocopied versions of it were already in use by musicians from 1978 (1357 SH).

=== Criticism ===
The radif of Iranian music has played an important role in the traditional music culture of Iran in the contemporary era. Nevertheless, the radif has also been the subject of criticism by various theorists, especially when compared with the system of maqam classification in music, which is still prevalent in Turkish and Arabic music today.

According to Bruno Nettl, the first person to offer such a critique of the radif was Hormoz Farhat. At the time, Farhat was a student at the University of California, Los Angeles in the United States. In his doctoral dissertation in music, he studied the radif of Iranian music. His dissertation (written in 1966) was eventually published as a book in 1990 by Cambridge University Press. In this book, Farhat described the radif as “an entirely incoherent collection of content,” a characterization that contradicted the earlier view that saw the dastgahs as similar sets that differed only in terms of scale structure. Around the same time, Mohammad-Taqi Massoudieh also offered a similar critique of vocal radif. While studying ethnomusicology and musicology at the University of Cologne in Germany, he found major discrepancies between the radif and actual performances of the Shur dastgah in his 1966 doctoral dissertation on Iranian singing.

Unlike the classification of maqams, which was based on the theory of adwar (cycles), the classification system of dastgahs and the concept of radif is not typically referred to as a “theory.” From Mohammad-Reza Lotfi’s perspective, this is because a theory implies reaching a formula that can be repeated by others to yield the same result (as with adwar), but the Iranian radif lacks such characteristics and allows the artist to break its rules. Mohsen Hajarian, in an article titled Determinism and Freedom in the Concepts of Radif and Dastgah published in the tenth Sheyda yearbook, also considers the radif to be an instance of “determinism” in Iranian music. He writes: “The radif is a deterministic construct, born out of unstable conservatism.” Hajarian also places the formation of the radif in contrast with the developments in Arabic and Turkish music, arguing that while in Turkish and Arabic music there were efforts to categorize musical modes based on “logic,” in Iranian music the focus remained on categorizing music into gushehs (melodic units) based on “tradition.” However, he notes that the more systematic approach adopted in Arabic and Turkish music imposed rhythmic constraints within frameworks known as usul in Turkish music and iqa‘at in Arabic music, whereas the radif, due to the indeterminate rhythm of most gushehs, allowed for greater freedom.

Another criticism of the Iranian radif is that its primary compilers (such as Mirza Abdollah) lacked sufficient theoretical knowledge of music, resulting in the loss of certain nuances of Iranian dastgahs during the process of codification. For example, Mohammad-Reza Lotfi believes that the subtonic in the Mahur dastgah was originally a semitone lower than that of the Rast-Panjgah dastgah, and that this used to be one of the distinctions between the two. However, when the radif was compiled by Mirza Abdollah, such subtleties were lost. Likewise, Kayhan Kalhor argues that the radif compiled by Mirza Abdollah and Agha Hosseinqoli is the Farahan Radif—representative of music from a specific region of Iran—and does not reflect the music of all of Iran. In his view, the insistence on preserving the radif in its current form (without adding or omitting any gushehs) contradicts the inherently transformative nature of music.

While some Iranian musicians consider the radif to be a manifestation of the dynamism and continuity of Iranian musical history, critics argue that it appeared rather suddenly in the mid-19th century and is more reflective of an innovation introduced by musicians of the Qajar court. The history of music prior to that period suggests that composition in traditional Iranian music, like Arabic and Turkish music, was based on the maqam system. Furthermore, the fact that the radif was developed by court musicians raises the issue that it may not represent all of Iranian music—especially considering Iran's ethnic diversity and varied musical traditions. From this perspective, the success of the radif as a modern method of classifying and teaching Iranian music can be attributed to several key developments: the initial support of the Qajar court, socio-economic changes that allowed the radif to move beyond the court and reach the public, and technological and economic advances that enabled the recording, documentation, and widespread dissemination of radif-based works.

In Iranian music, a person familiar with the radif and its subtleties is referred to as a radif-dan (knower of radif) or radif-shenas (expert on radif). Vocal radifs are generally recorded alongside the poems traditionally associated with each gusheh, and many traditional radif experts believe that written radifs must be performed exactly as documented, including the same lyrics. However, some radif-aware musicians—such as Mohammad-Reza Shajarian—are known for their lack of strict adherence to this framework. On this matter, Shajarian stated: “To say that Iranian music must remain confined within the radif is like saying no one should write poetry because Hafez already wrote the best of it!”

== Bibliography ==
=== Persian Sources ===
Until the first half of the 20th century, most of the works written about the Radif have either been lost or merely documented the Radif without critical analysis. Bohur al-Alhan by Forsat al-Dowleh Shirazi is among the earliest written works on the modal system of Iranian music. Although this work does not directly use the term “Radif” to describe the classification of dastgahs, it does list them in the common order (comprising seven dastgahs). In the book, a specific order of dastgahs is given as follows: Rast-Panjgah, Chahargah, Segah, Homayoun, Nava, Mahour, and Shur. Bohur al-Alhan was first published in 1332 AH (circa 1914 CE) in Bombay, and ten years later, when Forsat al-Dowleh came to Tehran and met Mehdi Solhi, a student of Mirza Abdollah, a more complete version of the book was published in Iran. Forsat al-Dowleh mentions in the book his unfamiliarity with musical notation; thus, the book only lists the gushehs of each dastgah without offering details on how they are performed. The remainder of the book is devoted to an analysis of prosody and its relationship with the rhythm of Iranian music, followed by a list of various poems typically performed within certain dastgahs, along with the full texts of the poems.

In the second half of the 20th century, several works analyzing and critiquing the Radif were published. The earliest of these were in English and German, but during both the Pahlavi era and after the Iranian Revolution, several important works were also published in Persian.

The book Radif-e Haft Dastgah-e Musiqi-ye Irani ("The Radif of the Seven Dastgahs of Iranian Music") was one of the first works in this field published in Persian. Initially published under the title Radif-e Musiqi-ye Iran, it included texts in both Persian and French. This book examines the modal structure of ancient Iranian music, analyzes the common intervals in Iranian music, and finally provides a list of dastgahs and gushehs along with musical notation for each. The book is considered influential due to its impact on later works, though it has faced criticism regarding its content and presentation style.

Dariush Talai has authored several significant works on the Radif of Iranian music. One of his most prominent contributions is the book Radif Analysis. This book, which won the Book of the Year Award in Iran, has been praised especially for its novel approach in analyzing the relationship between dastgahs and their foundational tetrachords. The Book of the Year Award has traditionally been rarely awarded to works in the field of music. The book consists of two main parts: a theoretical section and the Radif analysis. The theoretical section discusses topics such as “Intervals and Their Role in Shaping Modal Foundations,” “Function of Degrees,” “Introduction to Dastgahs and Avazes,” “Rhythm,” “Melody,” “Gushe Anatomy,” and “Dastgah in Performance.” The second part analyzes the main dastgahs and avazes of Iranian music, including Shur, Bayat-e Kord, Dashti, Bayat-e Tork, Abu Ata, Afshari, Segah, Nava, Homayoun, Bayat-e Esfahan, Chahargah, Mahour, and Rast-Panjgah.

Before Radif Analysis, Talai had addressed the modal aspect of the Radif in his book A New Perspective on the Theory of Iranian Music, published in 1372 SH (1993 CE). In that book, Talai formally proposed a theory stating that all Iranian dastgahs can be described using four primary tetrachords. Later in the book, the main gushehs of each dastgah are enumerated, and their pitch range and modal structure are presented in diagrams using the four tetrachords. This book and theory have been praised for offering a new method for understanding the theory of Radif music. Later, in the book Mirza Abdollah’s Radif: Educational and Analytical Notation, he attempted to describe the melodic patterns of the Radif within the framework of the same modal structure. Radif Analysis is essentially the culmination of this perspective. However, Talai’s scientific method for arriving at the theory, as well as his citation practices, have been subject to criticism.

The book Analysis and Explanation of the Radif of Iranian Music by Farhad Fakhreddini first introduces the musical modes and categorization used before the Radif system was formalized. Then, in nine chapters, it discusses the seven dastgahs of Iranian music and their associated gushehs. While this book has been praised by some critics, including Kambiz Roshanravan, others have criticized it for its outdated approach.

=== Non-Persian Sources ===
One of the earliest texts describing the Iranian music radif is the doctoral dissertation of Dr. Khachy, which was published as a book in 1962 at the University of Cologne. This book, titled Dastgah: Studies on Modern Iranian Music, explained the content of Mirza Abdullah’s radif. His doctoral advisor was Marius Schneider. This book was later used as a resource by Hormoz Farhat, Bruno Nettl, and others.

Ella Zonis, in his book Classical Persian Music (1973), analyzed the Iranian music radif based on a radif that Ruhollah Khaleqi presented to him at the National Music Conservatory. This radif was based on Mirza Abdullah’s radif and was transcribed through Alinaghi Vaziri. A notable point in this book is the similarities Zonis demonstrated between traditional Iranian music and ancient Greek music. However, the book has been criticized for ignoring the concept of “Owj” (the climax) among the radif’s gushehs (melodic pieces).

Gen'ichi Tsuge, a Japanese musician, published his dissertation in 1974 at Wesleyan University titled Singing: A Study of the Rhythmic Dimensions of Classical Iranian Music. This work, based on Tsuge’s field research in Tehran, is notable for examining the relationship between the rhythmic structure of poetry and the structure of the gushehs in which this poetry is sung (such as the gusheh Chaharpareh). However, the book did not investigate the similarities between the form of poetry and singing. This was later addressed by Mohsen Hejarian in his 1999 doctoral dissertation at the University of Maryland, College Park, titled Ghazal as a Determining Factor in the Structure of Iranian Dastgahs.

Jean During, a French musician, has written several books about the Iranian music radif, some of which have been translated into Persian, including Radif of Traditional Iranian Music and Tradition and Transformation in Iranian Music (1970). In the latter, During claims that some types of radif (including those of Darvish Khan and Abolhasan Saba) are simpler and aimed at the general musician, but some instrumental radifs, especially for setar or kamancheh, are more complex and designed for skilled performers. He also discusses the influence of Azerbaijani and Caucasian music on the Iranian radif. This book has been praised for its extensive information about Iranian musical instruments. It also includes a version of Mirza Abdullah’s radif collected by Noorali Boroumand and presented to During.

Bruno Nettl has written several books and articles about Iranian music and the radif. In the book An Introduction to Chahargah: A Study of Iranian Music Performance (1972), he examines forty different performances of the Chahargah dastgah, mostly instrumental, concluding that the dastgah system in music was influenced by prevalent singing traditions and highlights the importance of singing in the formation of the dastgahs. He also proposes that the formation of the dastgah system was a response to Western musical influences on contemporary Iran, serving as a method to assimilate these influences.

Nettl also wrote the book The Radif of Persian Music, Studies of Structure and Cultural Context in the Classical Music of Iran (1987), which provides an extensive analysis of the Iranian music radif. By comparing written and recorded versions of the radif, he points to its developments and inconsistencies. The book has been praised for its discussions on the evolution of the radif and its comparative analyses, including comparisons of Chahargah across 12 radifs, Mahour in 4 radifs, and Shur in 18 different radifs. Lloyd Miller has critiqued this book, noting that like many American scholars’ works, Nettl was influenced by figures such as Faramarz Payvar, who was part of his era’s modernists and did not limit himself to tradition; Miller contrasts this with most European scholars who were mostly influenced by Dariush Safvat and Mahmoud Karimi, who held more orthodox and traditional views on radif music theory. The book is also praised for the analytical prose, especially in chapters comparing radifs, but criticized for its limited coverage of vocal radifs.

Hormoz Farhat, in his doctoral dissertation written in English during his studies at UCLA, examined the Iranian music radif. This work, titled Dastgah in Iranian Music, was first published in English in 1965 and later in Persian. It drew attention due to differences from common radif classifications, such as counting twelve dastgahs instead of seven. Farhat, who left Iran as a teenager, initially focused on Western music and obtained a master’s degree in music from UCLA. In 1955, he met Mantle Hood, a prominent American ethnomusicologist, who inspired him to study Iranian music. Farhat’s book is considered the first to specify gusheh characteristics (such as the tonic note, final note, etc.). It also gained attention for its appendix containing 140 transcriptions of radifs by Nasrollah Zarrinpanjeh (for tar) and Ahmad Ebadi (for setar). Farhat also concluded from examining recorded radifs that five intervals are used in tuning Iranian instruments: microtones of about 90 cents, a neutral second between 125 to 145 cents, a larger neutral second between 150 to 170 cents, a whole tone of about 204 cents, and an interval larger than a whole tone of about 270 cents. Farhat’s theory, which states that intervals have no fixed size, has been influential. Criticisms of his work include inconsistencies between his definitions of gushehs and what appears in the transcriptions, and an excessive focus on a logical classification that leads to neglecting some traditions. Also, Farhat’s view on the decline of Iranian music after the Islamic Revolution has been challenged.

Stephen Blum has also produced several works about the radif. His dissertation titled Musics in Concept: The Cultivation of Oral Repertoires in Meshhed, Iran focused on singing. Although he did not address the radif directly, he examined gushehs called “Chaharbiati” and “Dobiyati” common in the native music of Khorasan. Blum also wrote multiple articles on the music of Khorasan, Kurdish music, and critiques of articles and books on Iranian radif music. Besides Stephen Blum, two other scholars made notable contributions to the study of vocal performance of dastgahs in the same period: Margaret Caton, who in 1983 wrote her dissertation at UCLA titled The Classical Tasnif: A Genre of Persian Vocal Music focusing on rhythmic and vocal performance of dastgahs; and Robert Sims, who in 1995 published the results of his research on the vocal performances of Mohammad Reza Shajarian, transcribing parts of Shajarian's performances from different periods.

== See also ==
- Avaz
- Tasnif
- Dastgah
- Muqam
