= Shahin Shahbazi =

Iranian composer, musician and poet (born 1978)

- Born: 1978 (age 47–48)
- Origin: Tehran, Iran
- Genres: Persian traditional music Persian Contemporary music, Fusion music
- Occupations: Composer, lute player
- Instruments: Tar, setar
- Years active: 1993–present
- Website: shahinshahbazi.com

Shahin Shahbazi (Persian: شاهین شهبازی; born 1978) is an Iranian composer, musician, and poet. He is mostly renowned for his mastery of the tar and setar and his composition of the complete radif works of maestro Ali Akbar Shahnazi with his band Nafir ensemble.

== Biography ==
Shahin Shahbazi was born in Tehran and became the apprentice of Ostad Dariush Talai at an early age. Later he learned and worked with some of the most famous masters of Iranian music like Mohammad-Reza Lotfi, Manouchehr Sahbaei, Hossein Dehlavi, Farhad Fakhredini and Houshang Zarif.

In 2002 he founded the Nafir Ensemble. His most famous composition with Nafir ensemble is the recording of Shahnazi's complete Radif work. This work is outstanding as it was the first time that a composer was capable to rewrite Shahnazi's Radif work for all traditional Iranian instruments. Furthermore, Nafir ensemble pioneered by becoming the first Iranian Radif orchestra. He is also music graduate of San Francisco State University(SFSU).

Together with Nafir ensemble Shahbazi performed many concerts, most notably during the UNESCO declared Rumi year in 2007 at the official celebrations in Konya and highly anticipated concerts at Irans most famous concerts hall, the Vahdat Hall.

== Albums ==
- Ayene va khesht 2004, Singer: Ostad Ahmad Ebrahimi
- Bi man maro, 2008, Singer: Bamdad Falahati
- Aberoye Ab, 2010, Singer: Bamdad Falahati
- Zakhmeye La Imrovisation of Tar 2010
- Action & Oration, with cooperation of maestro Ahmad Ebrahimi & Kurosh Bozorgpour 2011
- Radif Ostad Ali Akbar Khan Shahnazi, 2012
- Inak Az Omid, 2013
- Collection of pieces by Maestro Hooshang Zarif (arranged by: Shahin Shahbazi), 2013
- Yadvareye Eghbal Azar, Memorial of Maestro Eghbal Azar, Vocalist Sobhan Mehdipour 2014
- Zakhmeye La Imrovisation of Tar 2010
- Peyda va Penhan (Composer &Leader: Shahin Shahbazi) Vocals:Sobhan Mehdipour Performed by :Nafir ensemble 2018
- "Of That Silence" Composed by Shahin Shahbazi and Published in 2021, Vocals: Ruhan Parsa

== Books ==
- Shahin Shahbazi: Selected Work's of Amir jahed (Bargozideye Asaar Amir Jahed). A course in setar and tar, Tehran/Berahman 2005
- Chaharmezrab Interactive book(e-book) for advanced and intermediate Tar player.(Apple Book) Publisher: Shiva Enterprise 2019. Available in iTunes

== Awards ==
Elected as the winner of the “ first solo performers” Festival For The Young Players in Tehran 2000.

The album "Aberoye Ab" won the award for best Iranian classical music album at the Iranian Music Festival in 2013.
