= Sa'id Hormozi =

Ostad Sa'id Hormozi سعید هرمزی
- Sa'id Hormozi, playing a setar.

Background information
- Born: ca. 1898; Tehran
- Died: 30 October 1976 Tehran
- Genres: Iranian classical music, radif
- Occupations: musician, educator
- Instrument: Setar Tar

Ostad Sa'id Hormozi (Persian: سعید هرمزی; 1898–1976) was an Iranian musician who is remembered for his efforts to "promote authentic Iranian music" and pass it to modern musicians. He was born in one of the old neighborhoods of Tehran called Sangalaj. He was a prominent radif master and virtuoso tar and setar player.

He was a student of Darvish Khan (student of Mirza Hossein-Qoli, "one of the pioneers of Iranian music"), who awarded Hormozi with the medal of the "Golden Hatchet". That prize was given only to Khan's best students. He also studied musical color and rhythm with Haj Ali Akbar Khan Shahnaz (son of that same Mirza Hossein-Qoli).

He was friends and regularly played with Soleiman Khan Amir Ghasemi, a "famous professors of Iranian song and music."

In 1928 Hormozi founded a music school in Shapur street in Tehran. Later he cooperated with the "Center for preservation and propagation of Persian music" as a master teacher (Ostad) of setar, teaching musicians who were already professors of music.

On October 30, 1976 he died after a long illness.

== Legacy ==
Some invaluable recordings have been preserved of him, as a legacy.

His music allows hints to modern students of other Iranian musical masters. In terms of performance techniques one can find traces of his ostad Darvish Khan in Hormozi's peculiar style. His phrasing is mostly influenced by that of Aqa Hossein-Qoli.

Three prominent musicians who were his students include Mohammad Reza Lotfi and ostad Hossein Alizadeh and Dariush Talai.

== Recordings ==
- Sa'id Hormozi (Setar 1). Mahoor music (2000).
- Saʻid Hormozi, Setâr 2. Mahoor music (2003).
- Radif of Persian Music on Setâr, Interpreted and performed by Saʻid Hormozi. Mahoor music (2003). Works include examples of musical forms: Dastgâh-e Homâyun, Châhârgâh and Mâhur, Âvâz-e Dashti and Bayât-e Tork.

== See also ==
The following articles on the Persian Wikipedia (easily translated with a browser such as Chrome) cover material that the sources used in this article refer to. Without it, it is easy to gloss over color, rhythm, instrument and song as having the same meanings that they have in western musical theory.

- Color "Color", referred to above, as a Persian musical form, type of music played in 6/8 time, a subset of "corner.". Persian Wikipedia.
- Rhythm "Rhythm" as referred to above, also called "Multiplication", on the Persian Wikipedia. Consists of songs or "corners" that have a specific meter and a fixed beat pattern.
- Corner "Corner" on Persian Wikipedia. In Iranian music theory, a "row" is a collection of songs and melodies, and each of these songs is called a corner.
- Row. A "row" in the theory of Iranian music, is the arrangement of songs and melodies. Each of these songs, called a corner.
- Instrument. "instrument" in traditional Iranian music, refers to a collection of several melodies (corners) that are in harmony with each other in steps, tunes, and intervals of notes.
- Song "Song", here different: A special kind of musical form of song, which does not have a specific meter (in contrast to percussion songs and compositions that have a specific meter)
