= Shiraz Arts Festival =

Arts festival in Iran

Shiraz Festival of Arts
- Genre: Various (music, dance, drama, poetry and film)
- Dates: 10–22 September
- Locations: Shiraz/ Persepolis, Iran
- Years active: 1967–1977
- Founders: Farah Pahlavi; Farrokh Ghaffari

The Shiraz Festival of Arts (Persian: جشنواره هنر شیراز) was an Iranian annual international summer arts festival, held in Iran bringing about the encounter between the East and the West. It was held from 1967 to 1977 in the cities of Shiraz and Persepolis by the initiative of Shahbanu Farah Pahlavi.

== History ==
Accompanied by symposia and debates, the festival program included music, dance, drama and film, performed in a variety of locations in Shiraz and surrounding areas. The venues included the ruins of Persepolis (ceremonial capital of ancient Persia), Naqsh-e Rostam, Hafeziyeh, Bagh-e Delgosha, Narenjestan, Bazaar-e Vakil, Jahan-Nama Garden, Saray-e Moshir and a concert hall on the Shiraz University campus.

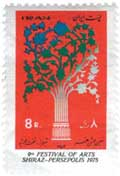
Stamp of the Shiraz Art Festival, 1975

=== Theatre ===
In theatre, Jerzy Grotowski, Peter Brook, Tadeusz Kantor, Arby Ovanessian, Bijan Mofid, Davoud Rashidi, Peter Schumann, Parviz Sayyad, Andrei Șerban, Robert Wilson, Shūji Terayama, Andre Gregory, Ali Nassirian, Víctor Garcia, Joseph Chaikin, and Esma'il Khalaj.

In this field, traditional plays such as ta'ziyehs (passion plays) from Iran directed by actor, director and theatre researcher Mohammad B. Ghaffari, Kathakali from India, and Noh from Japan, as well as Robert Serumaga with the National Theatre of Uganda, Duro Ladipo & the National Theatre of Nigeria, and Pabuji Ki Phad from India were presented, amongst many others .

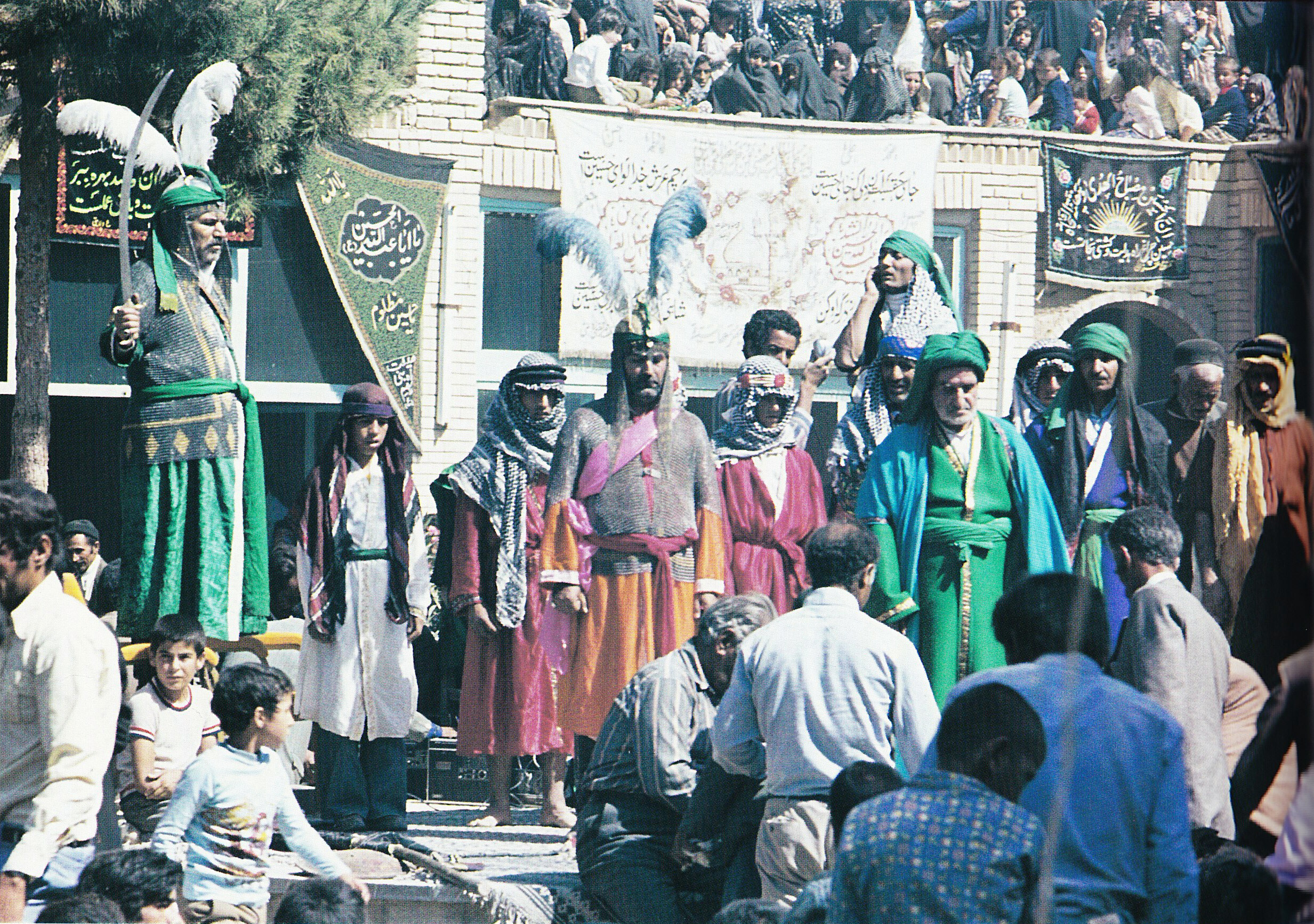
A ta'ziyeh performance taking place at Shiraz Festival, 1975

=== Music ===
In music, Iran's traditional musicians were presented, amongst them Hassan Kassai, Jalil Shahnaz, Ahmad Ebadi, Faramarz Payvar, Ali-Asghar Bahari, Hossein Tehrani, Hossein Qavami and Abdolvahab Shahidi. The young masters included Hossein Alizadeh, Dariush Talai, Mohammad-Reza Lotfi, Majid Kiani, Mohammad-Reza Shajarian, Parisa and Noureddin Razavi-Sarvestani. Indian classical musicians who appeared were Vilayat Khan, Bismillah Khan, Sharan Rani, Pran Nath, S. Balachander, Ravi Shankar, Ram Narayan, Chaurasia and Dagar.

Traditional non-Western music, some including dance, were presented from Afghanistan, Algeria, Bhutan, China, Egypt, Indonesia, Iraq, Japan, S, Korea, Morocco, Nepal, Pakistan, Philippines, Rwanda, Senegal, Tunisia, Turkey, Vietnam.

==== Western music ====
In the field of Western music Yehudi Menuhin, Christian Ferras, Martha Argerich, Arthur Rubinstein and Yvonne Loriod appeared in concert or recital .

The National Iranian Radio & Television Chamber Orchestra was a regular.

Other participants in this field from Iran were Morteza Hannaneh, and the Tehran Symphony Orchestra.

From the West, Gilbert Amy led the Orchestre du Domaine Musical, Bruno Maderna conducted the ORTF Orchestra as well as the Hague Residence Orchestra, Iannis Xenakis created "Persephassa" and "Persepolis", Bruno Maderna created "Ausstrahlung" based on Persian texts, Karlheinz Stockhausen was prominently featured one year, Krzysztof Penderecki led the Polish National Radio Symphony, Cathy Berberian, the London Sinfonietta, the Melos Ensemble, Morton Feldman & the Creative Associates appeared as well as John Cage, the Juilliard String Quartet, the American Brass Quintet, Max Roach Quintet performing together with Abbey Lincoln and the Staple Singers, amongst others.

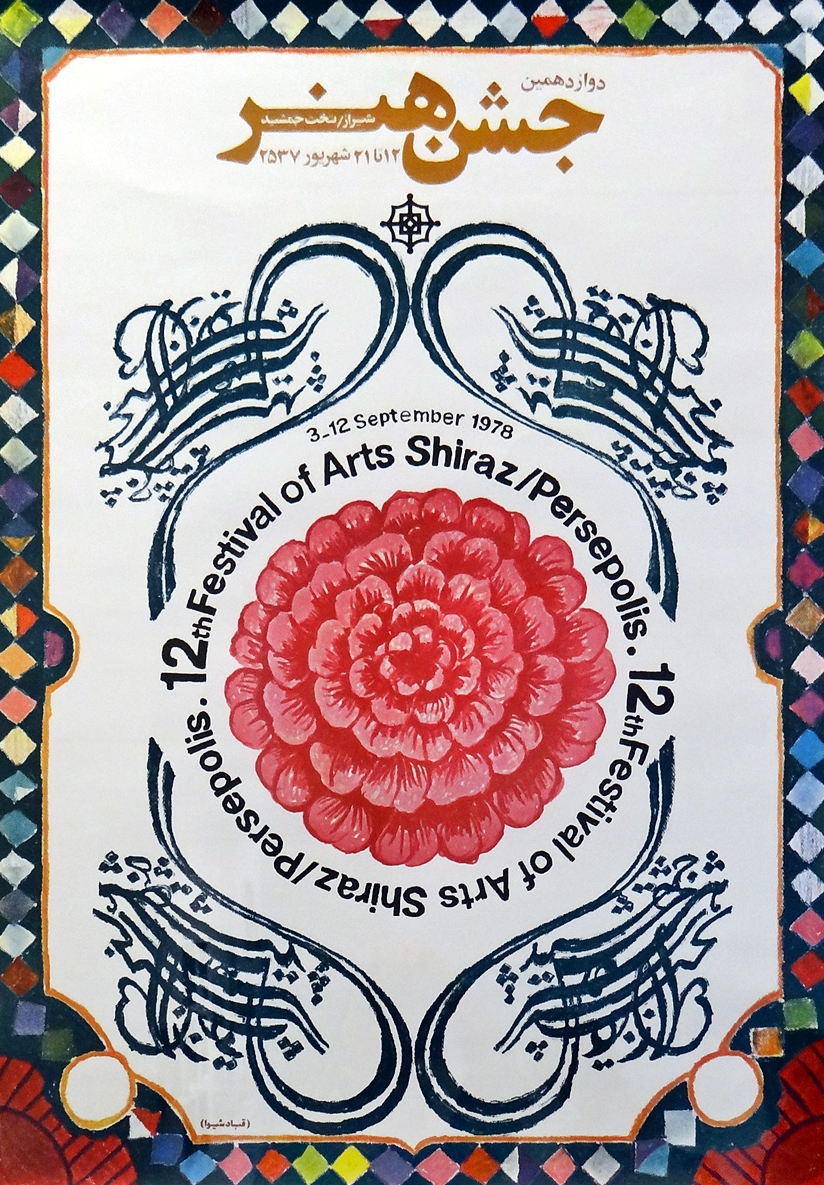
Poster of the cancelled 12th Festival of Arts, Shiraz

=== Closure ===
The twelfth festival was cancelled at the onset of the Islamic Revolution in 1978 out of concern for the safety of the performers.

== Gallery ==
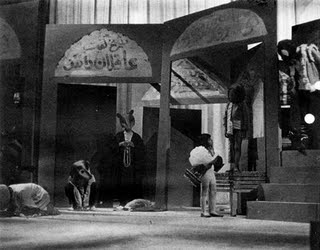
Shahre Gheseh by Bijan Mofid, 1968

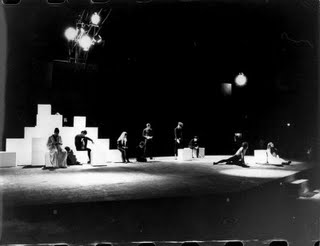
Moon and Leopard by Bijan Mofid, 1970

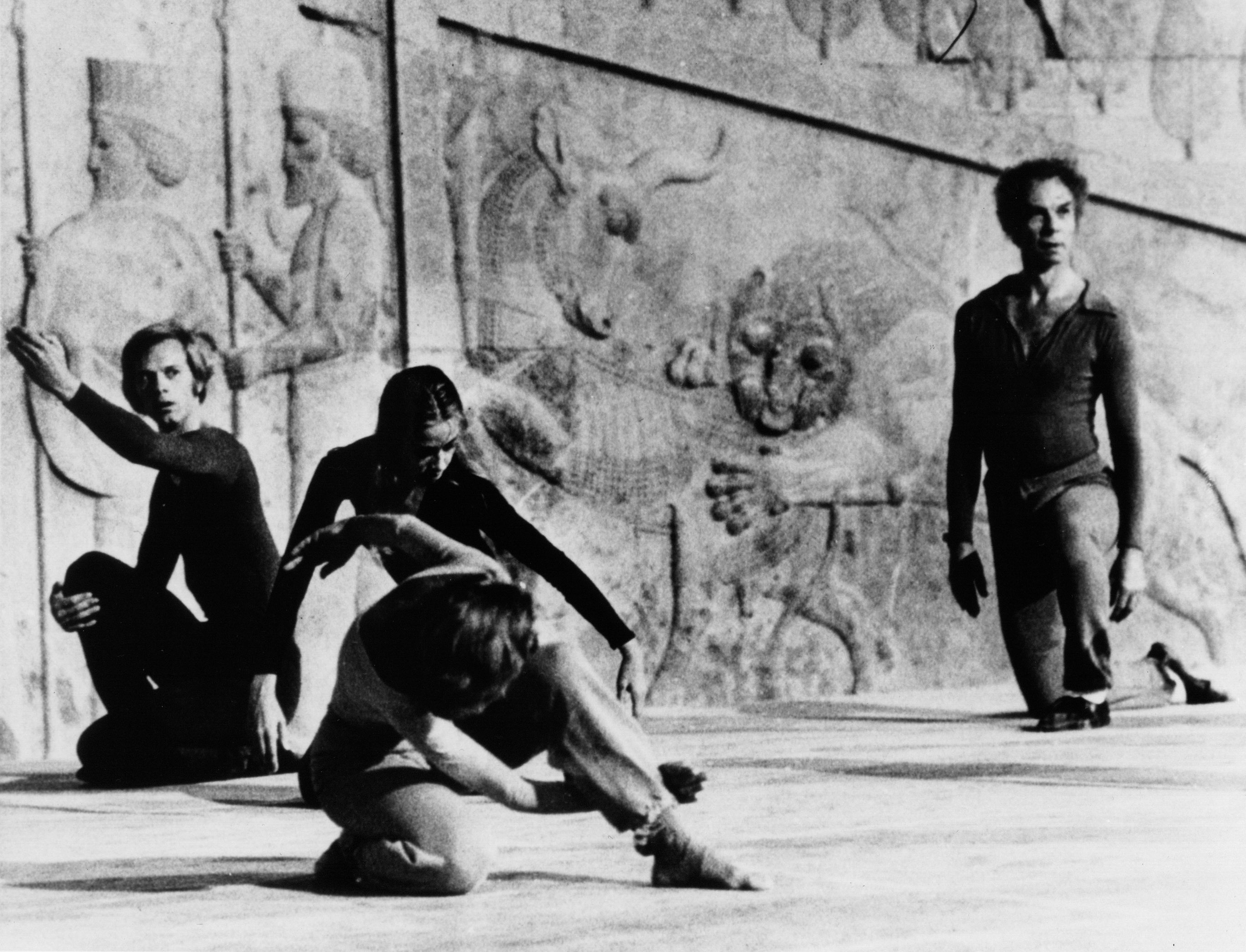
Persepolis Event, Douglas Dunn (left), Carolyn Brown (rear) and Merce Cunningham (right)

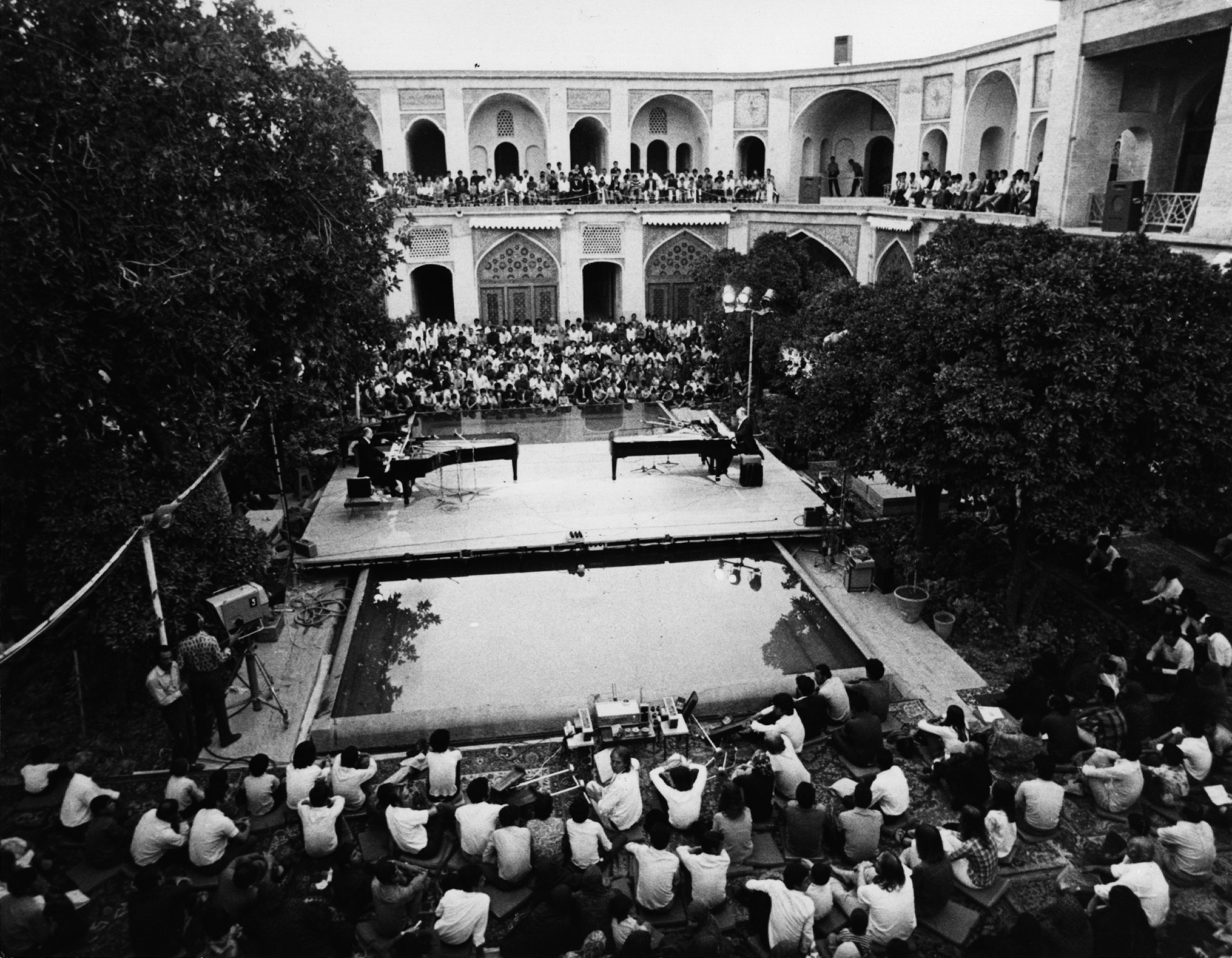
Stockhausen's Mantra on 2 September 1972, Aloys and Alfons Kontarsky, pianos, electronics by the composer (foreground)

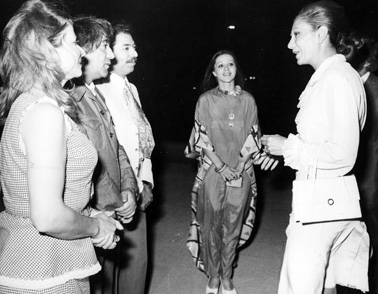
Farah Pahlavi talking to Farzaneh Taidi, Ali Nassirian, and Ezzatolah Entezami

Ravi Shankar performs at the Shiraz Arts Festival in the 1970s

Ram Narayan performs at the Shiraz Arts Festival in the 1970s

Faramarz Payvar, Jalil Shahnaz & Hossein Tehrani

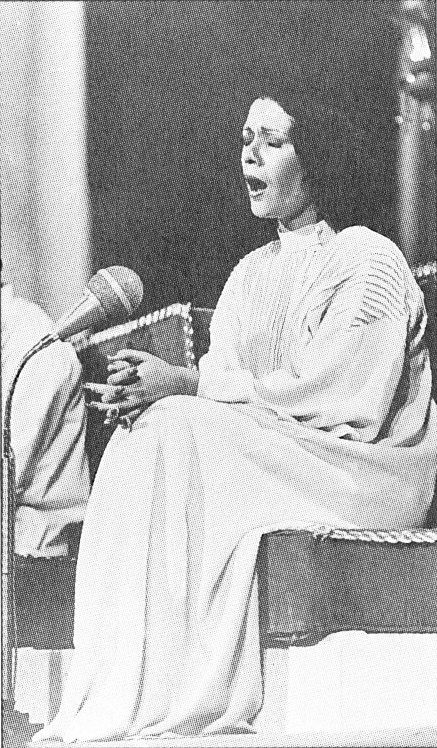
Parisa performs at the Shiraz Arts Festival 1967

== See also ==
- List of music festivals
