= Amir Nojan =

Persian traditional Setar player (born 1980)

Amir Nojan امیر نوژَن
- Born: April 11, 1980 (age 44); Shiraz, Iran
- Genres: Persian traditional
- Occupation: Professional Setar player
- Years active: 1992–present
- Website: https://www.AmirNojan.com

Amir Nojan (Persian: امیر نوژَن; born 1980 in Shiraz, Iran) is a Persian traditional Setar player. He started studying the traditional Persian music at the age of twelve with various masters. Some of his eminent teachers were Ustad Dariush Talai, Ustad Jalal Zolfonoon and Ustad MohammadReza Lotfi.

He established and has been directing Nava Ensemble since 1998 in Iran. Nojan has led concerts widely in Iran, Europe and the U.S. as composer, soloist, improviser and ensemble player.

In December 2011; he gave a lecture on “The History of Setar and its Significant Role in Iranian Classical Music” at Stanford University.

In July 2012, Nojan founded a center in the Persian music and arts named Shiraz Arts Academy in the northern California (San Jose). Shiraz Arts Academy is an educational institution specialized in the study and training of music and arts, it is where the talented students work with the distinguished instructors who are leading performers and music educators.

== Discography ==
- 2007: Published album: Live concert Iran, Shiraz: "Nava Ensemble's Concert"
- 2010: Published album: Live concert Czech Republic, Prague: "Raaz-e-roozegar"
