= Dariush Safvat =

Traditional Persian musician (1928–2013)

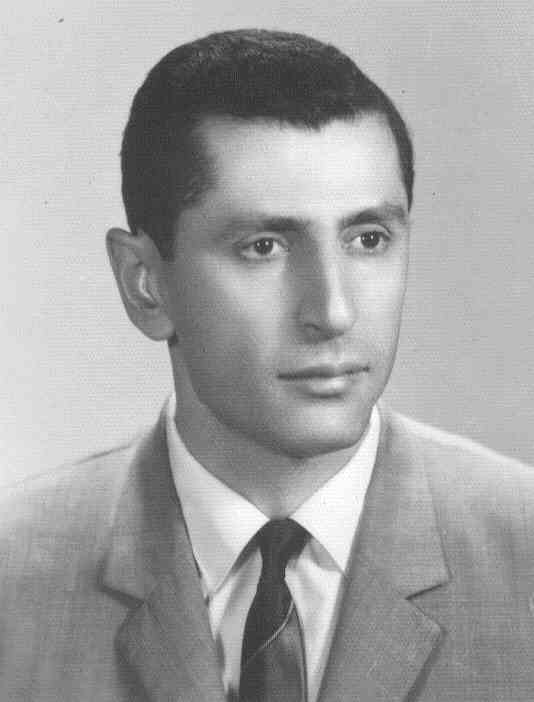
- Safvat in 1970s
- Born: 28 November 1928; Shiraz, Pahlavi Iran
- Died: 17 April 2013 (aged 84); Karaj, Iran
- Other name: Daryush Safvat
- Education: University of Tehran, Faculty of Law of Paris
- Occupations: Persian traditional musician, teacher, ethnomusicologist
- Known for: founder of the Center for the Preservation and Research of Music
- Awards: Ordre des Arts et des Lettres (2005)

Dariush Safvat (Persian: داريوش صفوت; 28 November 1928 – 17 April 2013) also spelled as Daryush Safvat, was an Iranian master Persian traditional musician, teacher, and ethnomusicologist. Safvat is best known for his mastery of setar and santur instruments. Safvat was the founding director of the Center for the Preservation and Research of Music in Tehran; and some credit Safvat with saving traditional music from obliteration in the 1970s.

== Early life and education ==
Dariush Safvat was born on 28 November 1928 in Shiraz, Iran. He began learning to play the setar at an early age from his father, Ali Asghar Safvat, who also played the ancient instrument. Among others, Safvat studied with two other Masters of Persian classical music, Abolhasan Saba and Haji Agha Mohammad Irani Mojarrad. However, Safvat claims the person who had the most influence on his life and music was Nur Ali Elahi, a Kurdish-Iranian judge, philosopher, theologian, and master musician.

He received a B.A. degree in law from the University of Tehran in 1953; and a Ph.D. in International Law from the Faculty of Law of Paris in 1965. He also studied at the Institute of Musicology in Paris.

== Career and music ==
Over the course of his distinguished career, he held many key posts in academia and the music scene, among them a Fellow at the Academy of Sciences, of the Islamic Republic of Iran.

The Center for the Preservation and Research of Music (formally known as the Center for Preservation and Propagation of Iranian Music, and the Center for the Preservation and Dissemination of Music) was founded in 1968 in Tehran by Safvat, a school specializing in traditional Iranian music. He is credited with having taught some of the most talented Iranian musicians of the 20th century in Iran, including well-known santur players Parviz Meshkatian and Majid Kiani, and master setar player, Jalal Zolfonoun. The Center counts among its graduates some of the most prolific and admired masters of classical Persian music, including Mohammad Reza Lotfi, Hossein Alizadeh, Hossein Omoumi, Parisa, the late Nasser Farhangfar, Dariush Talai, Majid Kiani, and Mahmoud Farahmand.

Safvat has published a number of books and articles in Persian, French and English, and has produced a large number of recordings, but what is most remarkable is the degree to which his humanity, piety and integrity have made him popular among both the music elite and the masses alike.

== Late life and death ==
In March 2005, he received the Ordre des Arts et des Lettres award, granted by the French government.

Safvat died on 17 April 2013 in Karaj, Iran from natural causes.

== Bibliography ==
- During, Jean; Mirabdolbaghi, Zia; Safvat, Dariush (1991). The Art of Persian Music. Washington D.C.: Mage Publishers. ISBN 978-0-934211-22-2.
