= Parisa =

Persian traditional singer (b. 1950)

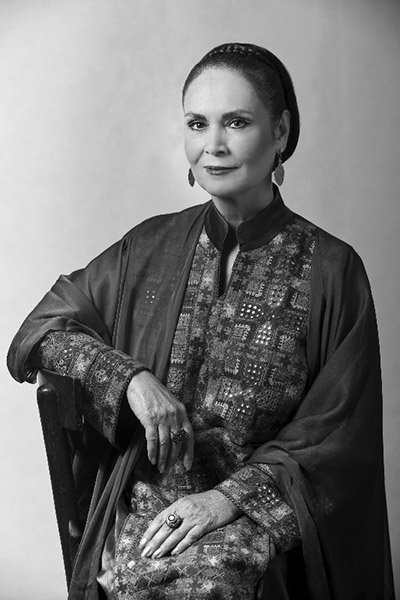
- Parisa, 2015 (photo by Saghar Barekat)

Background information
- Born: Fatemeh Va'ezi; 16 March 1950 (age 76)
- Origin: Tonekabon, Iran
- Genres: Classical Persian music
- Occupations: Vocalist, singer, musician
- Years active: 1960s–present
- Website: Parīssā

Fatemeh Va'ezi (Persian: فاطمه واعظی; born 16 March 1950, in Tonekabon, Iran), better known as Parisa (Persian: پریسا), is a Persian classical singer, Avaz master, and one of the foremost female vocalists of Iran.

== Early life and musical training ==
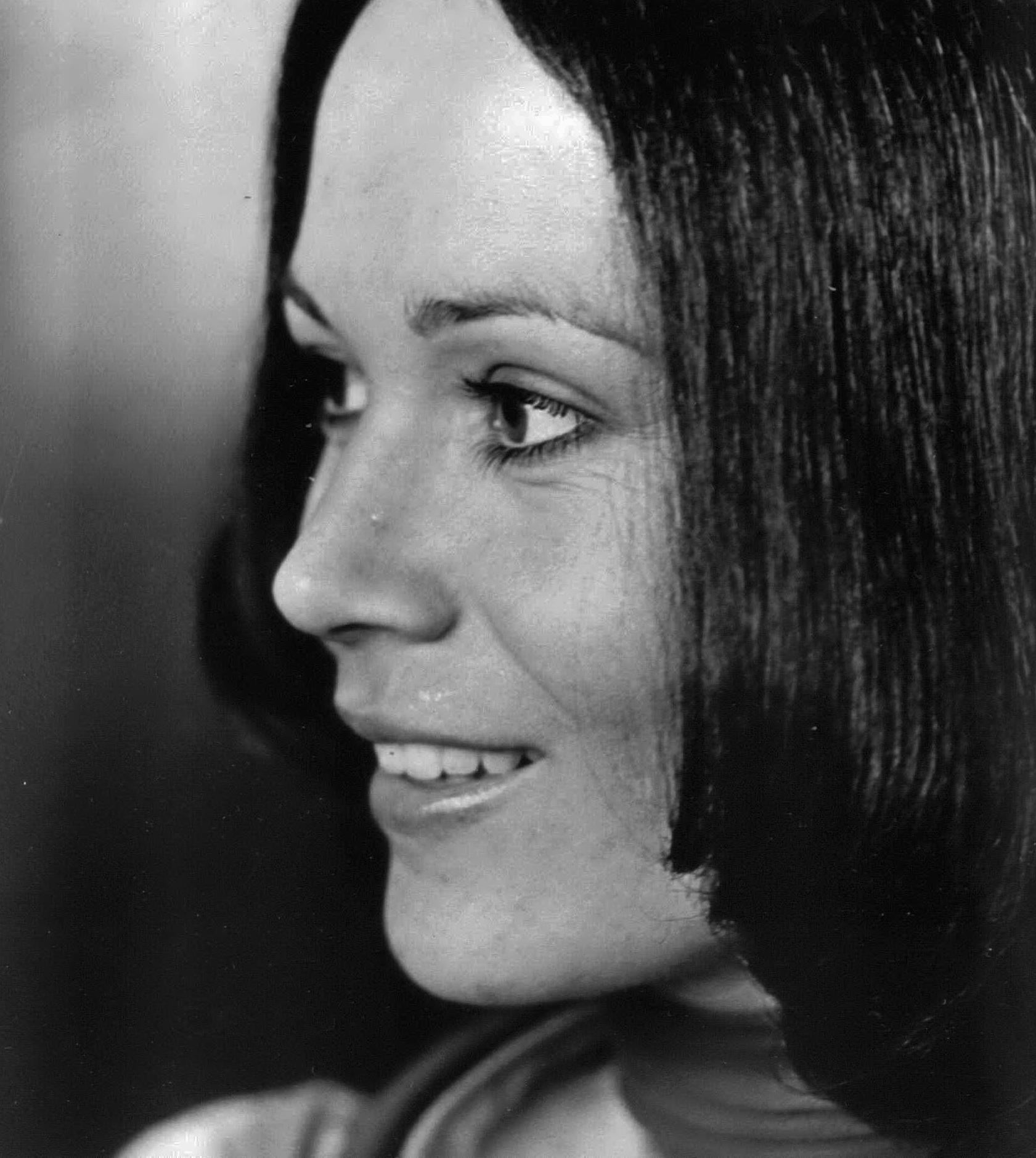
Parisa in the 1970s

After finishing high school, emphasizing Persian literature, she started her musical work under the supervision of the renowned Persian Radif teacher, Mahmoud Karimi, a highly respected teacher of classical Persian music whose vast knowledge of the ancient repertoire was fundamental to her career.

Karimi once commented: "Parisa is my most promising pupil, and she can sing all the modes with the skill of re-interpretation or improvisation necessary to perform Iranian music correctly".

== Career ==
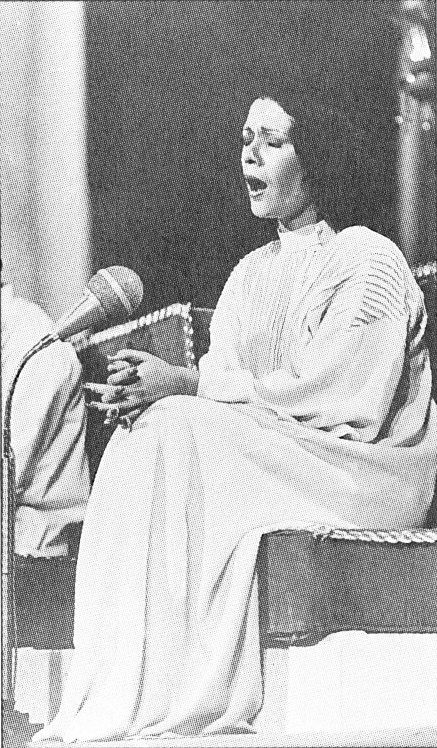
Parisa performing at the Shiraz Arts Festival

In the early 1970s, Parisa trained intensely with vocal master Mahmud Karimi at the Honarestan-e Musiqi-ye Meli (National Music Academy) and occasionally performed at the Ministry of Culture's Rudaki Hall. Fulbright scholar of Iranian music Lloyd Miller was also studying with master Karimi in the men's vocal class at the Music Academy. One day master Karimi invited Miller to visit the women's class. Miller was stunned by Parisa's excellent verbal skills and decided to do everything possible to help her rise to the top of the Tehran music scene. As a music writer in most publications in Tehran, Miller began to continually praise everything about Parisa, while he was also writing relatively negative reviews about some of the westernized pop-oriented concerts presented by the Ministry of Culture at Rudaki Hall. Miller was the PR person for the Center for Preservation and Propagation of Iranian Music, directed by grand master Dariush Safvat.

Since Parisa was funded by a scholarship from the Ministry of Culture, she could not be a member of the NIRT Center until she worked off her scholarship by performing for the Ministry. This situation saddened Miller, but one day was invited to Rudaki Hall for a meeting with an official from the Ministry. At the conference, Miller was asked what it would take to stop writing scathing negative articles about the Ministry for their "inappropriate modern and pop music efforts". According to him, if the Ministry would "allow Parisa to join the Center's cadre of rising young masters of totally traditional music," he would "only write about the good concerts at the Ministry like western classical music or other harmless efforts." The next day when Miller went to the Center he was shocked to see Parisa sitting waiting for an interview with master Safvat. She was consequently immediately accepted and began her career as one of Iran's foremost vocalists.

Meanwhile, Miller had applied to be the A and R person for CBS Iran but was rejected in favor of Marcel, a popular modernized piano personality. Miller was told he was dismissed because he had an agenda and couldn't be fair in his music selections. Miller was not discouraged, and at a party soon after, he befriended Marsel and enticed him to come to Dr. Safvat's Center to hear the incredible vocalist and instrumentalists in the country. Marcel was immediately converted to Parisa and soon produced three cassette tapes that hit the top of the music charts in Tehran. Parisa and the Center's musicians offered many concerts in Iran and at the annual Shiraz Art Festival. She also performed at festivals in Europe and Japan.

After the 1979 Iranian Revolution, Parisa was no longer allowed to perform in public. However, she should have been the one lady vocalist who would have been accepted, except that other less appropriate singers would try to get back their claim to fame. So she devoted herself to her family and giving private lessons.

In 1980, she was again invited to teach traditional Persian music at the Center, which she continued to do until 1995. Since then, she has performed at music festivals and major concert halls throughout the world with many prominent groups and musicians, including Dastan Ensemble, Dariush Tala'i, and Hossein Omoumi.

Parisa currently lives in Tehran, Iran.

== Concerts and tours ==
Although still based in Iran, for the last 20 years, she has been able to tour widely, performing Persian and Sufi music in Europe and the US, and has recorded several albums. Here is a list of her activities up to 2012:

1970–1975	Vocalist in the Ministry of Arts and Culture, performing throughout Iran, Pakistan and Afghanistan.
1973	Concerts: 40 concerts in 40 cities in France to introduce the art of Persian classical music.
1975–1981	Vocalist and instructor at the Center for Preservation and Propagation of Iranian Music. Published numerous recordings by CBS Records.
1975, 1976, 1977	Concerts: The Shiraz Arts Festival performed some of the most groundbreaking and memorable concerts along with influential young musicians at the time.
1978	Concerts: Invited to attend the "Asian Traditional Performing Arts Festival" in Japan under the auspices of the Japan Foundation. The main emphasis was placed on the vocal music of Burma, India, Iran, Mongolia and Japan. The official reports of the series of seminars and workshops have been documented in a book entitled Musical Voices of Asia published by the Japan Foundation (1980). Eleven 16mm movies, an album of three LP records, and an accompanying CD entitled Classical Vocal Art of Persian were also produced from this event.
1979–1995	Unable to perform publicly after the Iranian revolution. Devoted this time to research and teaching the vocal Radif contributed to the publication The Art of Persian Music, by Jean During and published by Mage publications, and the accompanying CD: The Anthology of Persian Music.
1995	Album released: Baz Amadam Series of concerts in England, France, Germany, Sweden, Switzerland and the Netherlands after 15 years of silence.
1996	Festival: Festival des Voix Sacreés, France Three vocalists were invited to represent the vocal tradition of their respective religions: Jewish, Christian and Islamic, at "l´Arsenal de Metz".
1996	Concerts: Salle Olivier Messiaen and Radio Denmark Invited by Radio France. with Hossein Omoumi (Ney), Saam (Daf) The disc Tale of Love was released from these performances later.
1996	Concert: Théâtre de la Ville, Paris with Hossein Omoumi (Ney), Saam (Daf)
1996	Concert: Royal Festival Hall II, London with Hossein Omoumi (Ney), Saam (Daf)
1997	Festival: e Festival de L´ Été à Bourges, France Invited for an event entitled "Nuit des Voix de Femme".
1998 (Sep–Oct)	Album released: Tale of Love (Medley) Festival: Women In Traditions, invited by MultiCulti inc. London (Queen Elizabeth Hall), with Hossein Omoumi (Ney) and Saam (Daf)
1998	Tour: USA and Canada with Hossein Omoumi (Ney), Pejman Haddadi (Tombak), Saam (Daf) New York (Symphony Space), Philadelphia (Rosemont College, Lawrence Hall), Tampa (University of South Florida - Coopers Hall), Miami: Ash Auditorium (Hyatt Regency Hotel), Washington DC (George Washington University Lisner Auditorium, Atlanta (Emory University), San Diego (Museum of Contemporary Art), Seattle (University of Washington- HUB Auditorium), San Francisco (Palace of Fine Art), Los Angeles (UCLA Wadsworth Theater), Portland (Scottish Rite Center), Vancouver (Centennial Theatre), Toronto (Seneca College), Montreal (Dalle Brebouf College) Later the albums Tale of Love I and II were released from these performances.
1999 (Feb)	Tour: Australia Sydney (University of Macquarie), Melbourne (University of Latrobe), Adelaide (Theatre of Royal), Perte (University of Perte)
1999 (Aug)	Album released: Tale of Love I | Esfahan Concert: Voix d ete en Creuse, France, with Hossein Omoumi
1999 (Oct)	Festival: "FestKoncert" of Munich, Germany
2000 (Apr)	Concert: London: Queen Elizabeth Hall With Behdad Shahideh (Tar), and her son, Dara Afraz, for the first time. He accompanied the group with Daf.
2001 (Nov)	Concert: Switzerland: Voix Sacrées du Monde, Lausanne with Behdad Shahideh (Tar), Dara Afraz (Daf)
2002 (Jun–Jul)	Festival: The Silk Road, Washington D.C., USA 36th Annual Smithsonian Folk Life Festival performing with Daryush Talai (Tar)
2002 (Sep–Oct)	Album released: Tale of Love II | Nava Tour: USA, with Daryush Talai: New York (Asia Society and Museum), Hawaii (Honolulu Academy of Arts), Berkley (First Congregational Church), Los Angeles (Wadsworth Theatre, Persian Arts Society)
2002 (Oct–Dec)	Tour: Europe, with Dastan Ensemble: Berlin (SFB Grosser Sendesaal), Hamburg (Musikhalle), Kobenhavem (Amager Bio), Stockholm (Folkets Hus) Goteborg (Universitet / Astisten), Helsingborg (Dunkers Kulturhus), Antwerpen, Amsterdam, Utrecht, Oslo, Frankfurt (HR Sendesaal), Giessen (Kongresshalle), Munich (Goethe Institute, Freiburg (Historisches Kaufhaus), London (Queen Elizabeth Hall), Cologne, Heidelberg (Kongresshaus Stadthalle)
2003 (Apr–Jun)	Album released: Shoorideh - Parissa and Ensemble Dastan Tour: Canada and USA, with Dastan Ensemble Toronto, Montreal, Ottawa, Vancouver, Seattle, Portland, Orange County, San Francisco, New York, New Haven, Washington D.C., Cleveland, Chicago, Atlanta
2004	Concert: European tour in Berlin, Paris, and London with Dastan Ensemble
2005	Album released: Gol-e Behesht - Parissa and Ensemble Dastan A European tour with Dastan Ensemble and joining the Tar and Setar Seminar in the Netherlands. Venice, Rome, Freiberg, Koln, Oslo
2006	Concert: Madrid, Spain Performing the album Shoorideh with Dastan Ensemble
2006	Tour: USA and Canada, with Dastan Ensemble: Montreal, Ottawa, Toronto, Vancouver, New York, Atlanta, Dallas, Chicago, Ann Arbor, Michigan, Orange County, Los Angeles, San Francisco, San Diego
2007	Concert: Performing the Gol-e Behesht in the Fes Festival Fes, Morocco with Dastan Ensemble
2007	Album released: Simplicity - Parissa and Iman Vaziri
2007	Concert: Brussels, Belgium: Female Voices Festival Performing the album Simplicity. with Iman Vaziri (Tar) and Ali Rahimi (Tombak) Some master classes and workshops were included in this festival.
2007	Concert: Brussels, Belgium: Female Voices Festival Performing the album Simplicity. with Iman Vaziri (Tar) and Ali Rahimi (Tombak) Some master classes and workshops were included in this festival.
2008	Concert: Italy and Spain Florence (Italy): Festival MUSICA DEI PAPOLI Barcelona (Spain): QADAR Festival Performing the album Simplicity and a new one-hour program
2008	Concert: Paris, Rennes & Dusseldorf Performing the expanded version of the project Simplicity with the company of Kamancheh in Düsseldorf. Iman Vaziri (Tar), Ali Rahimi (Tombak) and Ehsan Zabihifar (Kamancheh)
2009	Concert: Asia Society, New York performing at the Muslim Voices festival, Asia Society Iman Vaziri (Tar), Dara Afraz (Tombak)
2009	Concert: Lombrana, Santander, Spain (August 8) performing at the Santander International Festival Iman Vaziri (Tar), Dara Afraz (Tombak)
2009	Concert: Uppsala, Sweden performing at the Uppsala Sacred Music Festival Iman Vaziri (Tar), Dara Afraz (Tombak) and Ehsan Zabihifar (Kamancheh)
2010	Concert: Santiago, Sweden performing at the festival of Sacred sounds Iman Vaziri (Tar), Dara Afraz (Tombak)
2012 (May–June)	Tour: West USA and Canada with Hamnavazan Ensemble

== See also ==
- Iranian music
- Persian traditional music
- List of Iranian women
- Shiraz Arts Festival
