= Houshang Zarif =

Iranian tar player (1938–2020)

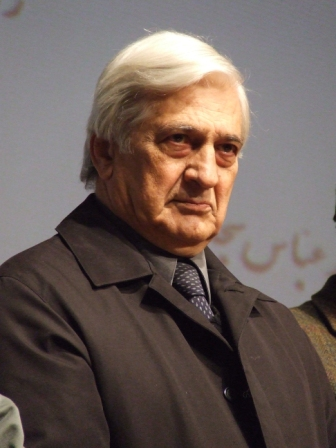

Background information
- Born: December 7, 1938; Tehran, Iran
- Died: March 7, 2020 (aged 81); Tehran, Iran
- Genres: Persian Traditional, Contemporary Classical, Soundtrack
- Instrument(s): Tar, Tombak
- Years active: 1958–2020

Houshang Zarif (Persian: هوشنگ ظریف, also romanized as "Hūshang Zarīf"; December 7, 1938 – March 7, 2020) was an Iranian master of tar and Persian traditional music.

== Biography and career ==
Houshang Zarif was born on December 7, 1938 in Tehran. He was a graduate of the Persian National Music Conservatory in Tehran; where he studied tar with Mousa Maroufi. Zarif worked with the Fine Arts Administration Orchestra, conducted by Hossein Dehlavi in the 1950s and was the professor of tar at the National Conservatory for several years; Hossein Alizadeh was among his pupils.

Zarif died in Tehran on 7 March 2020, aged 81.

== Notable students ==
- Hossein Alizadeh
- Dariush Talai
- Hamid Motebassem
