= Mohammad-Reza Lotfi =

Iranian musician; tar and setar player

Mohammad-Reza Lotfi محمدرضا لطفی
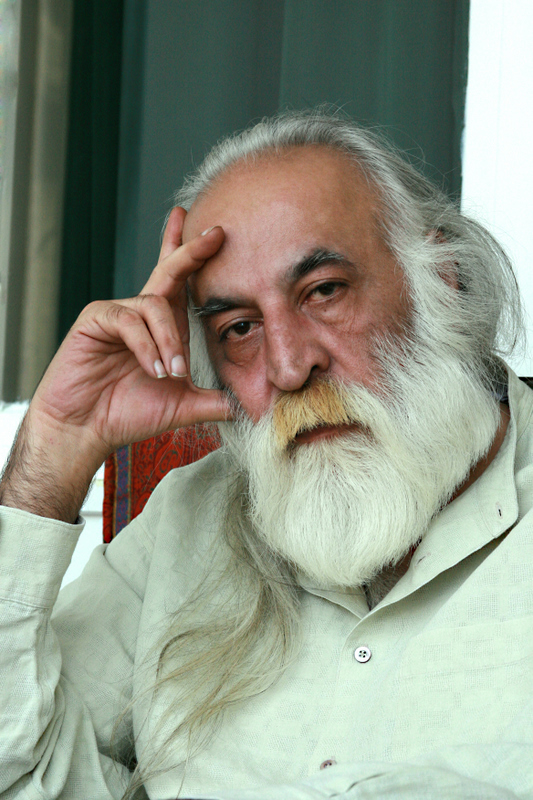

Background information
- Born: 1 January 1947; Gorgan, Iran
- Died: 2 May 2014 (aged 67) Tehran, Iran
- Genres: Classical Persian music
- Occupation: Musician
- Instrument(s): Tar, setar, kamancheh, daf
- Years active: 1964–2014
- Labels: Avaye Shayda
- Website: shayda.info

Mohammad-Reza Lotfi (Persian: محمدرضا لطفی; 1 January 1947 – 2 May 2014) was an Iranian classical musician renowned for his mastery of the tar and setar. He collaborated with singers such as Mohammad-Rezā Shajarian, Hengameh Akhavan, Shahram Nazeri and Alireza Shahmohammadi.

== Life and career ==
Mohammad Reza Lotfi was born on January 17, 1947, in the city of Gorgan, in a cultured family where both his parents were teachers.

Encouraged by his older brother, he learned to play the tar and showed his talent by winning the first prize in Iran's Young Musicians Festival in 1964. The following year, he started his studies at the Persian National Music Conservatory in Tehran under Habibollah Salehi and Master Ali Akbar Shahnazi. He was a tar player for the Fine Arts Administration Orchestra (Saba Orchestra) under the direction of Hossein Dehlavi. Some of his other eminent teachers were Abdollah Davami, from whom he learned the Radif, and Master Sa'id Hormozi, who taught him the setar.

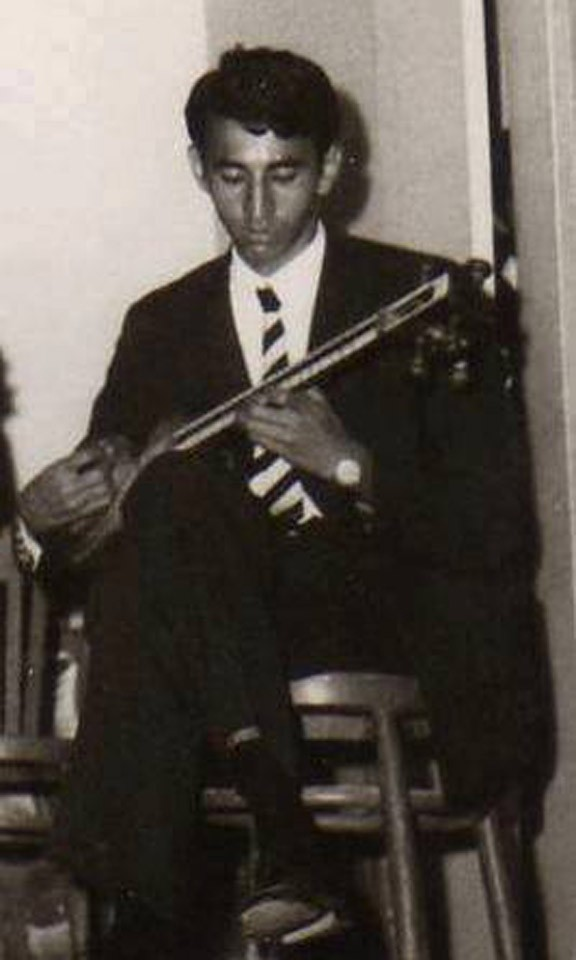
Young Lotfi playing the tar

While attending the College of Fine Arts at Tehran University, Lotfi became the student of Master Nour-Ali Boroumand. He also worked at the Center for the Preservation and Propagation of Traditional Persian Music, both as a soloist and a conductor. His other accomplishments were teaching at the Center for Intellectual Development of Children and Adolescents, researching folk music for National Radio and Television, and appearing at the Shiraz Arts Festival. After graduating in 1973, Lotfi joined the faculty of Fine Arts at Tehran University.

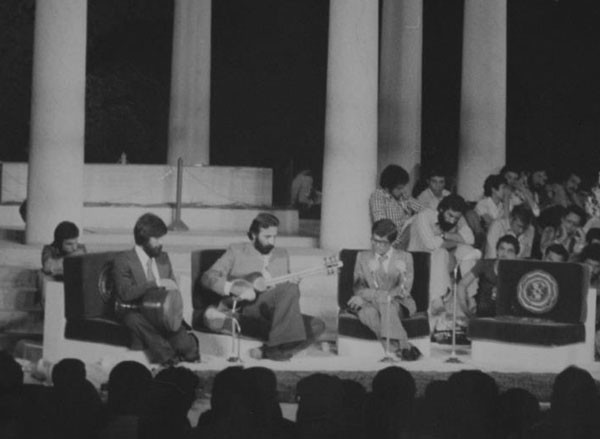
Lotfi (Second from Left) Performing in Shiraz Arts Festival with Naser Farhangfar (first from left) and Shajarian, 1976

He continued his collaboration with Radio and Television and co-founded the Shayda Ensemble. Between 1978 and 1980, Lotfi became the Head of the School of Music at The University of Tehran. He served as the director of the Center for the Preservation and Propagation of Traditional Persian Music and the "Chavosh" Center. In 1984, Lotfi was invited by Fondazione Cini to participate in a seminar and perform concerts in Italy, where he resided for two years. He lived in the United States from 1986 until his death and performed widely throughout Asia, Europe, and North America.

A prolific musician, he made numerous recordings both as a solo artist and with the celebrated Iranian musicians such as Mohammad Reza Shajarian, Shahram Nazeri, Hossein Alizadeh, and Parviz Meshkatian. Lotfi is one of the greatest contemporary masters of the tar and setar. He is among the major figures who, in the past twenty years, have revolutionized the Persian traditional (classical) music. His innovative approach of combining the classical with folk elements, both in terms of music and technique, has injected a new vitality into a very old tradition. His original creativity and the deep-rooted emotional quality of his playing have made him the father of a new aesthetics in Persian music.

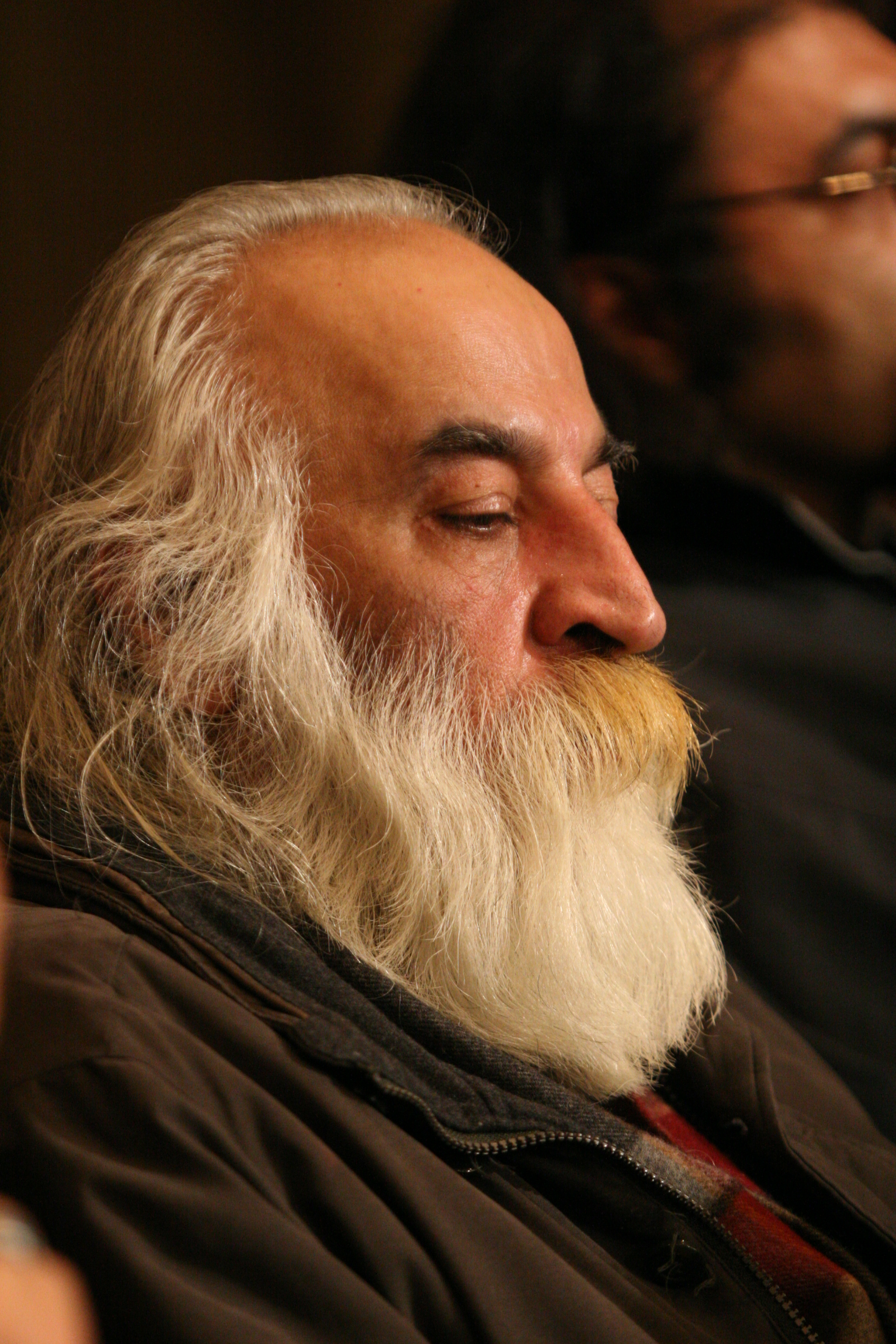
Mohammad-Reza Lotfi

== Selected vocal works ==
Mohammad Reza Lotfi has performed many works with Mohammad Reza Shajarian performed in radio or common concerts. He also has many self-vocal works.

This is important that Lotfi and Shajarian performed in the Rast-Panjgah mode in a live concert (1976), at which point no one had performed in this mode for at least 20 years.

- Raast-Panjgaah concert with Mohammad Reza Shajarian and Naser Farhangfar in Rast Panjgah (1976).
- In Remember of Aref with Mohammad Reza Shajarian and the Shayda Ensemble in Bayat Turk (1986).
- Sepideh Album with Mohammad Reza Shajarian and the Sheyda Ensemble in Mahoor
- Love Knows with Mohammad Reza Shajarian in Aboutata (1981).
- Cheshmeye Noush with Mohammad Reza Shajarian and Mjid Khaladj in Rast Panjgah (1994).
- Chehre be Chehre with Mohammad Reza Shajarian in Nava (1978).
- Karevan-e Shahid with Shahram Nazeri and Shayda Ensemble in Dashti
- ‘’’Mahour Concert and album with Alireza Shahmohammadi
- Vatanam Iran (Mohammad Motamedi & Hamnavazan-e Sheida (Sheyda Ensembl) – 2008
- ’’’ Radif Mirza Abdollah (Alireza Shahmohammadi)
- Yadvareye Aref-e Ghazvini (Mohammad Motamedi & Hamnavazan-e Sheida (Sheyda Ensembl) – 2009)
- Ey Asheghan (Mohammad Motamedi & Banovan-e Sheida (Sheida Women) – 2009)
- Video album of Karavan-e-shahid’’’ (Alireza Shahmohammadi - 2009)
- Video album of Dashti Concert – Vatanam Iran (Mohammad Motamedi & Sheida Threefold Groups – 2008)
- Video album of Chavosh Concert 8-(Alireza Shahmohammadi Iran Ey Saraye Omid (Mohammad Motamedi & Hamnavazan-e Sheida (Sheyda

== Death ==
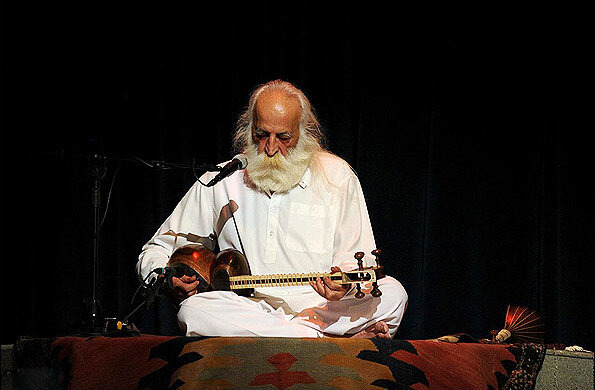
Mohammad-Reza Lotfi playing tar in a concert.

Mohammad-Reza Lotfi died on 2 May 2014 (age of 67) suffering from prostate cancer. According to Hamid Dabashi, Lotfi's death marked "a crucial turning point in the history of classical Persian music and its spectacular rise and fall as a performing public art."

== See also ==
- Music of Iran
- List of Iranian musicians

== Notes ==
- Miller, Lloyd. "Music and Song in Persia". Curzon Press, London, 1999.
- Akbarzadeh, Pejman. "Persian Musicians" (vol.3). Roshanak Publications/ Iran Heritage Society, Tehran / Los Angeles, 2008.
- Laudan Nooshin, in The New Grove Dictionary of Music and Musicians, edited by Stanley Sadie, second edition (Macmillan, London, 2001). ISBN 1-56159-239-0. (Oxford University Press, 2001). ISBN 0-19-517067-9.
- Dabashi, Hamid. "Persian classical music mourns a master: The death of virtuoso Mohammad Reza Lotfi marks the end of an era". Aljazeera, 20 May 2014.
