= Shashtar =

Musical instrument

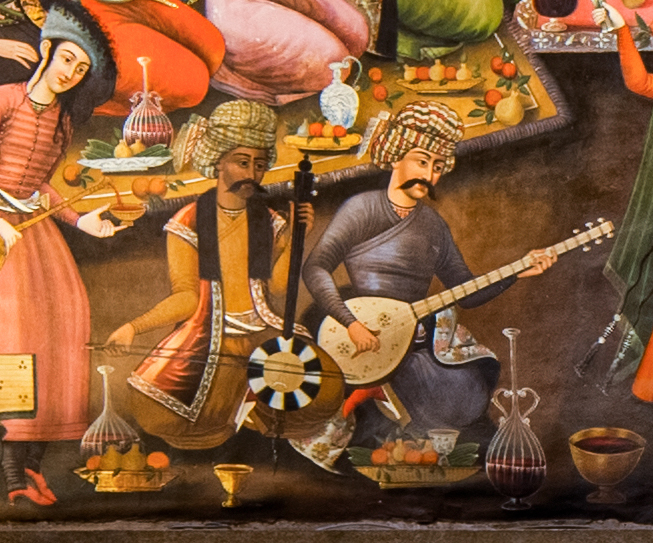
- 6-stringed Şeştar shown in mural in Chehel Sotoun.

String instrument
- Other names: Sheshtar, Shashtay, Şeştar, Sheshtay
- Classification: String instrument
- Hornbostel–Sachs classification: (Composite chordophone)
- Developed: West or Central Asia

The Shashtar, Sheshtar or Shashtay (probably from Persian Şaş-tar or Şeş-tar, ششتار or شش‌تار, lit. 'six-string', 'having six strings') is a stringed musical instrument of the lute family. It was mentioned historically by Evliya Çelebi and Abd al-Qadir Maraghi. It is or was played in Iran/Persia, Afghanistan, Azerbaijan and elsewhere. It may have been developed during the Safavid era from the tambur. Like the tambur, it has a floating bridge and a wooden soundboard (not skin like the rubab etc.). The 6 gut strings were in 3 double courses, and thus it may be a forerunner of the Tar.
