= Majid Kiani =

Iranian musician and researcher

Majid Kiani (Persian: مجید کیانی) is a Master of the Persian Santur. He was the best student of Manoochehr Sadeghi, among others. He teaches traditional Iranian music and his masterpiece is the book named: "Seven Dastgah(s) of Iranian Music". He is a leading figure in the Iranian musical establishment, and known for his controlled expositions.

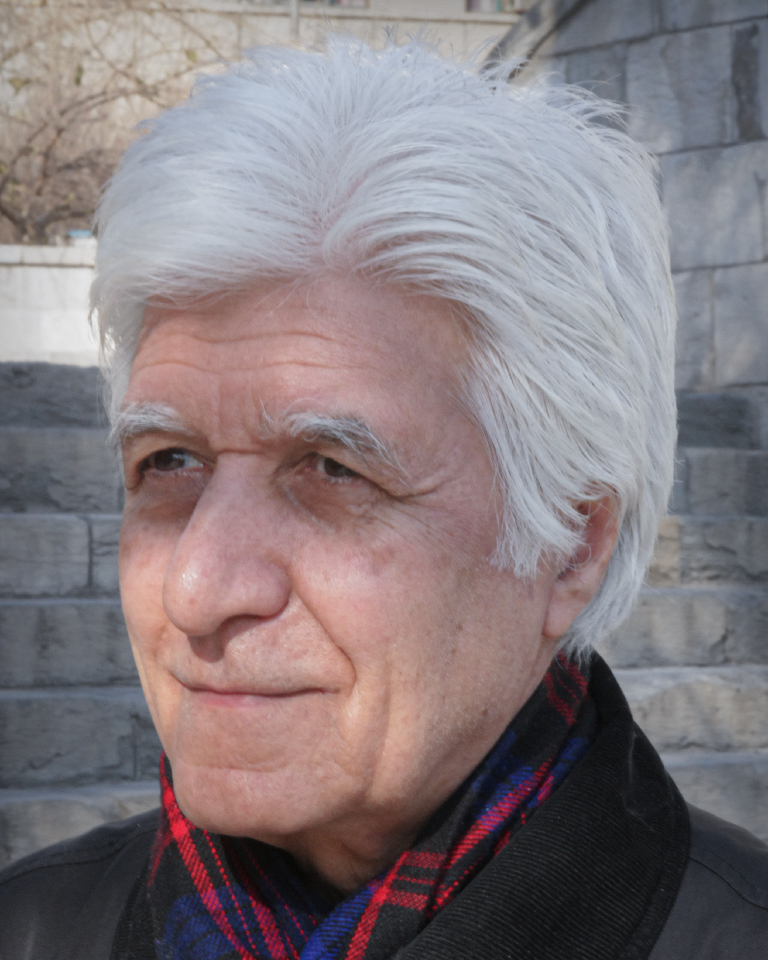
Majid Kiani in 2012

== Recordings ==
Sources:

- 1979 Masters Of Traditional Music Vol. 1, Dariush Tala'i (tar and setar), Mohammad Musavi (ney), Majid Kiani (santur)(Recording information: Téhéran, Iran 1979) This disc is made up of individual solo renditions by the three performers (Mohammad Musavi is accompanied by Jamshid Mohebbi (zarb)), and makes a fine introduction to Iranian classical music. The modes are: Avaz Bayat-e Esfahan (Tala'i), Dastgah Chahargah (Tala'i), Dastgah Homayun (Musavi), Avaz Bayat-e Kord (Kiani). This is the best place to start for an introduction to Iranian classical instruments.
- 1992 Musique Iranienne: Iranian Music For Zarb & Santur: Including an improvisation on the zarb, an improvisation in the Segah Dastgah mode by Majid Kiani on the extensive santur (a zither), followed by a work for the tar.
- 1993 The Classical Tradition of Iran, Volume III The Santur: Majid Kiani, with Djamshid Shemirani (zarb) (Record: Harmonia Mundi HMA 190395) Majid Kiani plays full suites (in Dastgah Rastpanjgah and Dastgah Segah) on this recording, as opposed to less standard sequences he plays on the Ocora disc above. In particular, the intricate Dastgah Rastpanjgah really benefits from the precise treatment on this disc.
- 1995 Great Masters of the Santur (Record: ASIN: B00008F27R).
- 2009 Piruzan
- Radif with Djamshid Shemirani Harmonia Mundi.
