= Anjoman-e Okhovat =

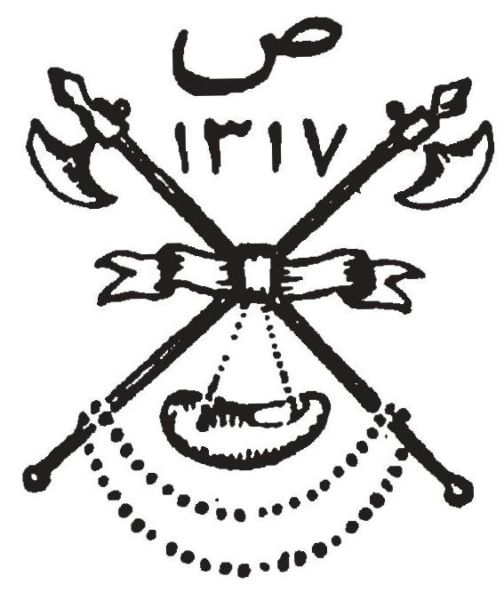
Coat of arms of the Anjoman-e Okhovat. Shahrokh Raei notes: "The coat of arms consists of two dervish axes (tabarzīn), which intersect and form a multiplication sign, a begging bowl (kashkūl) and a rosary (tasbīḥ)". The letter ṣād at the top refers to the founder of the order Safa'alishah (i.e., Ali Khan-e Qajar, also known as Zahir-ol-Dowleh). The year 1317 (1899) written between the two axes refers to the foundation year of the Anjoman-e Okhovat.

The Anjoman-e Okhovat (Note: Also spelled "Anjoman-e Okhowwat" or "Anjuman-i Ukhuvvat".) (Persian: انجمن اخوت, lit. 'Society of Brotherhood') was a Freemason-like mystical society rooted in Sufism. Founded in Qajar Iran, in 1899, it was originally a continuation of the Safi'alishahi branch of Ni'matullāhī, an Iranian Shia Sufi order.

== History ==
The founder and first leader of the Safi'alishahi lineage was Mirza Hasan Esfahani, also known as Safi'alishah (died 5 May 1899). Safi'alishah's charisma and social activities enabled him to attract a large number of followers, including members of the upper classes such as many government officials and the elite from the capital city Tehran. Intellectually, the society was based on the philosophical doctrine of the 10th-century Brethren of Purity. Safi'alishah was succeeded, in accordance with his own wish, by Ali Khan-e Qajar, also known as Ali Khan-e Zahir-ol-Dowleh or Safa'alishah (died 1924), a member of the royal Qajar dynasty and minister at court. Shortly after Safi'alishah's death, Zahir-ol-Dowleh announced the official establishment of the society on 21 December 1899, which gained the recognition of the ruling King of Iran Mozaffar al-Din Shah Qajar (r. 1896–1907).

Following Zahir-ol-Dowleh's death in 1924, leadership of the society passed, successively, to Mirza Seyyed Mohammad Entezam ol-Saltaneh (Binish Alishah; died 1932); Esmail Marzban (Amin ol-Molk; died 1960); Farajollah Aqevli (died 1974); and Abdollah Entezam (died 1983). Not much is known about the activities of the Anjoman following the Islamic Revolution of 1979. Some sessions were held at the Zahir ol-Dowleh lodge until 2007. In recent decades, lodges of the Anjoman are known to have been converted into public institutions.

== Activities ==
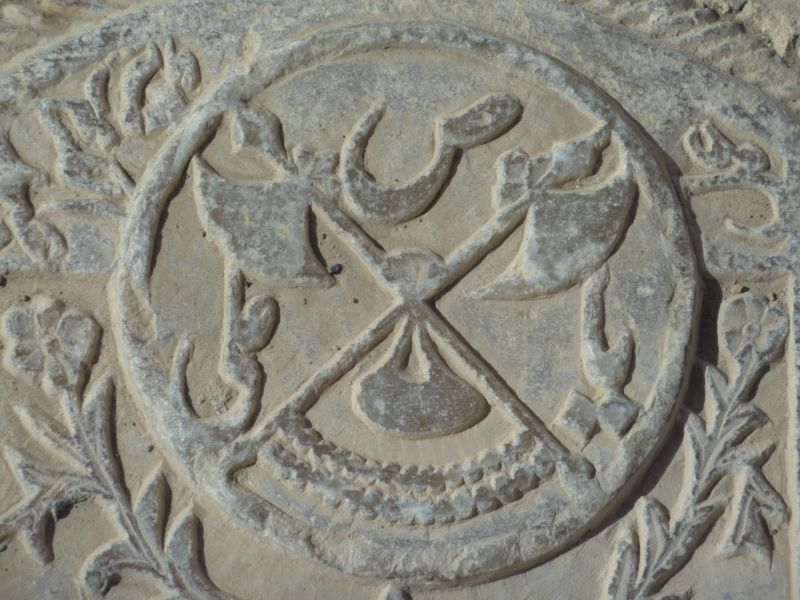
Coat of arms of Anjoman-e Okhovat engraved on a gravestone in Shahreza, Isfahan province. Photo taken in 2009

The Anjoman society was modeled after Masonic lodges. It promoted intellectualism and reformism according to the third edition of the Encyclopedia of Islam as it "strove to promote cultural and social development through extensive multifaceted activities, to establish social equality, and to reduce the gap between social classes". A point of focus was to emphasize cultural and artistic activities. Many of its members held high political offices, and most prominent musicians at the time were members of the society as well. Although the society was allegedly "apolitical", a large amount of "its cultural activities had anti-despotic and reformist undertones that supported the constitutionalists' demands". In the last years of Qajar rule, by 1923–4, the society had c. 34,000 registered and initiated members. Many of its members held high political offices.

== Publications ==
The society published numerous periodicals, including the Majmue-ye akhlaq ("Ethical miscellany"), the Okhovat-e Shiraz, the Okhovat, and the daily Kukab-e gharb ("The western star").

== Sources ==
- Algar, Hamid (1991). "Religious Forces in Eighteenth- and Nineteenth-Century Iran". In Avery, Peter; Hambly, Gavin R. G.; Melville, Charles Peter (eds.). The Cambridge History of Iran: From Nadir Shah to the Islamic Republic. Vol. 7. Cambridge: Cambridge University Press. ISBN 0-521-20095-4.
- Anwār, ʿA.; EIr (1985). "ANJOMAN-E OḴOWWAT". In Yarshater, Ehsan (ed.). Encyclopædia Iranica. Vol. II/1: Anāmaka–Anthropology. London and New York: Routledge & Kegan Paul. pp. 88–89. ISBN 978-0-71009-101-7.
- Raei, Shahrokh (2020). "Anjuman-i Ukhuvvat". In Fleet, Kate; Krämer, Gudrun; Matringe, Denis; Nawas, John; Rowson, Everett (eds.). Encyclopaedia of Islam (3rd ed.). Brill Online. ISSN 1873-9830.
