= Darvish Khan =

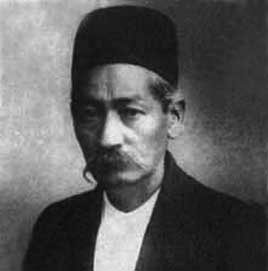
- Gholamhossein Darvish Khan, Iranian traditional musician

Background information
- Born: 1872
- Origin: Tehran, Iran
- Died: 22 November 1926 (aged 53–54)
- Genres: Persian traditional music
- Instrument: Tar

Darvish Khan (Persian: درویش‌خان, Gholam Hossein Darvish; 1872 – 22 November 1926) was a Persian classical musician and a tar player.

== Biography ==
Darvish Khan was born in Tehran.

His teachers included his father and Aqa Hossein-Qoli Farahani. He was a member of the Aziz Soltan music group. Later, he attended the Dar ol-Fonoon Music School.

He gave a concert at the Grand Hotel of Tehran with other great masters of Persian music of his time, including Aref Qazvini. Darvish left for London and Tbilisi to make recordings.

He died at the age of 54, on 22 November 1926, in an accident. His carriage was hit by a lorry, a vehicle that was very rare at the time. He is said to have been the first Iranian killed in a car accident.

== See also ==
- Music of Iran
- List of Iranian musicians
