= Lloyd Miller (musician) =

American jazz musician (1938–2024)

Lloyd Miller (November 11, 1938 – December 27, 2024) was an American jazz musician. He was known for his research in Persian and Afghan music. He was proficient in several instruments across jazz, ethnic, and world music traditions.

Miller was a scholar of Persian music. He earned his doctorate in Middle East Studies and published books on Persian and Afghan music, including Music and Song in Persia: The Art of Avaz and Afghan Music and Dance: Shared Arts of Persia's Past, Highlighting 1970s Herat, both of which explore the cultural and historical connections between the two regions. In addition to his academic work, he was an arts writer and public relations officer, contributing to the promotion and understanding of Persian and Afghan music.

== Career ==
=== Jazz career ===
In the 1950s and 1960s, Miller performed jazz with musicians such as Don Ellis and Eddie Harris. He was also the soloist in the music ensemble of Jef Gilson in Paris.

=== Studies ===
Returning to the U.S. in 1963 to study at Brigham Young University, Miller organized Eastern and jazz music ensembles and won the composer's trophy at the 1967 Intercollegiate Jazz Festival. He earned a BA in Asian Studies and pursued an MA in Middle Eastern Studies at the University of Utah. In 1969, he won the national Sounds of Young America composers contest for his piece "Yona".

=== Time in Iran ===
Miller spent seven years in Iran on a Fulbright scholarship. Known as Kurosh Ali Khan, he hosted a television show in Iran during the 1970s and worked as a journalist for several Iranian publications. His mother, Maxine Adams Miller, authored Bright Blue Beads: An American Family In Persia.

=== Death ===
Lloyd Miller died of a stroke on the morning of December 27, 2024, at the age of 86. While the exact cause of death was not disclosed, his wife said that he had recently suffered a stroke and had been in declining health.

== Works ==
Miller's recording titled Oriental Jazz, produced in 1968, was re-released as a CD and features selections of jazz and oriental music blends. He also released seven other vinyl LPs during the 1960s and released over 30 CDs and DVDs of his own music.
