= Ali-Akbar Shahnazi =

Ali-Akbar Shahnazi علی‌اکبر شهنازی
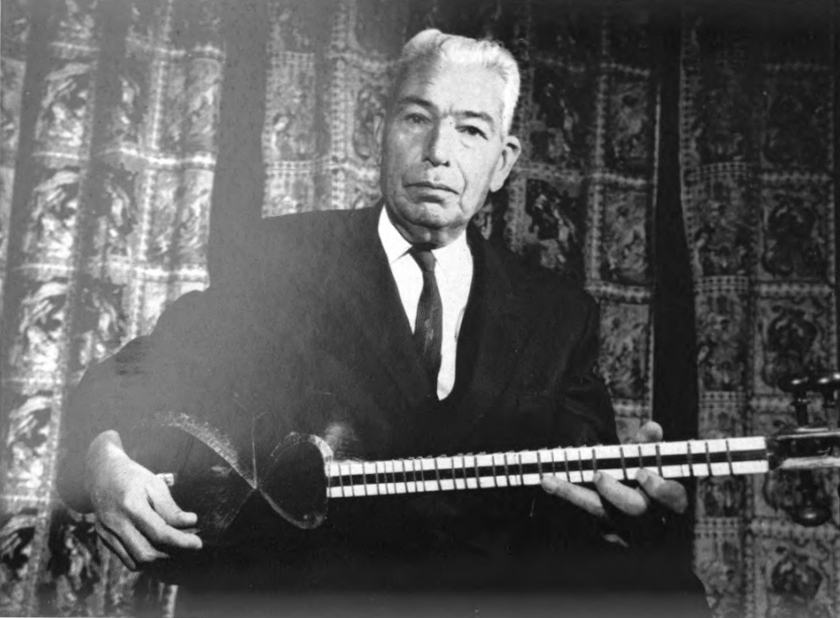

Background information
- Born: Mirza Ali Akbar; 12 May 1897; Tehran, Qajar Iran
- Died: March 17, 1985 (aged 87) Tehran, Iran
- Instrument: Tar

Ali-Akbar Shahnazi (Persian: علی‌اکبر شهنازی; 12 May 1897 – 17 March 1985) was an Iranian musician and a master player of the tar instrument.

== Biography ==
Ali Akbar Shahnazi was born in Tehran, Qajar Iran, on 12 May 1897. His father, Mirza Hossein-Qoli, another master of the tar, named him Ali-Akbar according to a very old tradition: the grandson should be named as his grandfather. His younger brother Abdolhossein Shahnazi and sister Zinatolmolouk Shahnazi were also masters of the tar.

He recorded many pieces with noted vocalists of his time such as Abolhassan Eghbal-Azar and Hossein-Ali Nakisa. He collaborated with other masters of his time such as Reza Mahjubi (violinist) and Hossein Tehrāni (the father of modern tonbak). He not only taught his students his father's radif collection, but also composed a beautiful radif, which he named radif-e dowre-ye āli (Persian: ردیف دورهٔ عالی) and taught it to his students too.

Shahnazi comes from a music family called in Persian Khanedan-e Honar (خاندان هنر), literally meaning "art dynasty".

Shahnazi died on 17 March 1985 at the age of 87.

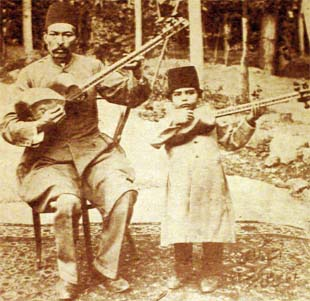
Young Ali-Akbar Shahnazi (right) and his father Mirza Hossein-Qoli (left)
