= Dariush Talai =

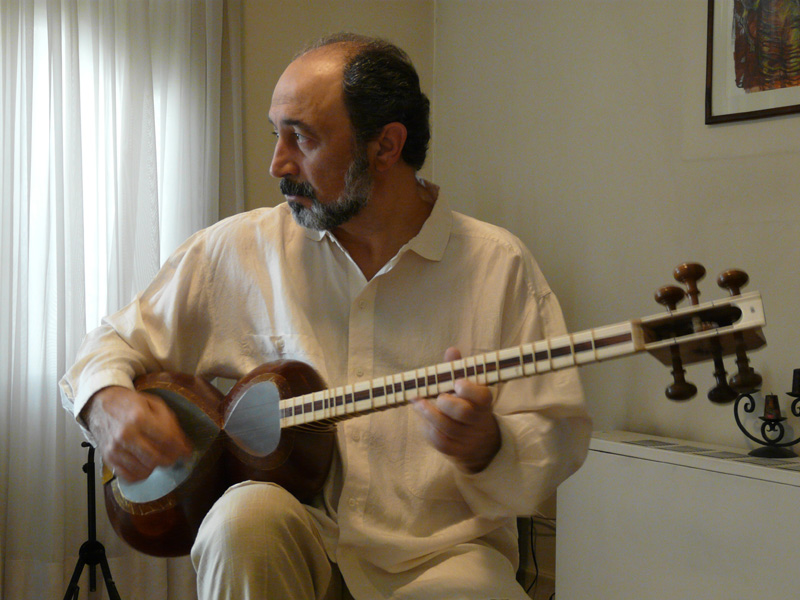

Background information
- Born: 1953 (age 72–73)
- Origin: Tehran, Iran
- Genre: Persian Music
- Instruments: Setar, Tar

Dariush Talai plays both the Tar and Setar.

Born in 1953 in Iran, he studied Persian music with masters of the Radif. His teachers include Tar player Ali Akbar Shahnazi, Nur Ali Borumand with whom he studied radio and old compositions, as well as Youssef Forutan and Abdollah Davami, with whom he studied Setar and vocal techniques and repertories.

Master Talai taught at the University of Tehran, University of Sorbonne-Paris, University of Washington-Seattle and was awarded several major prizes for his contribution to Persian Art Music. His collaboration with artists such as Maurice Béjart, Carolyn Carlson, Michel Portal.

== Recordings ==
- 1978 Anthologie de la musique traditionnelle - Setar and Tar (Record: Ref. Paris OCORA 558540).
- 1980 Tradition classique de l'Iran (Record: Ref. Harmonia Mundi No. 1031), France.

Side A: Improvisation in Shur - SideB: Improvisation in Mahour (D. Talai, Tar / D.Chemirani, Zarb).

- 1982 Trobada de music a de mediterrani Vol. 1, Face 1 (Record: Ref. Diffusion mediterrania-lsagunt 17-13a 46009 Valencia).
- 1983 Musique traditionnelle, Radio France (Two cassettes, Ref. OCORA 4558617/8).

Cassette n°1: SideA Improvisation in Mahour (D.Talai, Tar / D.Chemirani, Zarb). FaceB Improvisation in Shur (D.Talai, Setar / D.Chemirani, Zarb). Cassette n°2: SideA Improvisation in Tchahargagh (D.Talai, Tar / D.Chemirani, Zarb). SideB Improvisation (D.Chemirani, Zarb), Tchaharmezrab Darvish khan (D.Talai, Setar / D.Chemirani, Zarb).

- 1987 Dariush Talai: Tar and Setar (Cassette).

SideA Improvisation in Nava, and (SideB) Modulation in Shur (D.Talai, Tar / D.Chemirani, Zarb). SideB Improvisation in Mahour (D.Talai, Setar / M.Gavihelm, Zarb).

- 1988 Le Târ et le Sétâr de Dariush Talai (Video Tape, CEMO-INALCO).
- 1991 Iran: Les Maîtres de la Musique Traditionnelle, France; Vol. 3 and Bands on Vol. 1, Setar and Tar (CD, Ref.Paris OCORA C560024).

Vol. 1 Band 1 Improvisation in Avaz-e Bayat-e Esfahan (D.Talai, Tar). Band 2 Improvisation in Tchahargah (D.Talai, Setar). Vol3 Bands 1 to 4 Avaz-e Afshari - Bands 5 to end Dastgah-e Mahour (Shahram Nazeri, Vocal / D.Talai, Setar / B.Kamkar, Zarb and Daf).

- 1992 Performance of Radif of Mirza Abdollah on the Setar and the book "A New Approach to the Theory of Persian Art Music" (in Iran).
- 1992 Performance on Setar (in Iran).

In Shur, Bayet-e Esfahan and Segah (D.Talai, Setar).

- 1993 Concerti Digar (in Iran).

In Afshari and Mahour (D.Talai, Setar / Sh.Nazeri, Singer).

- 1993 Iran: Les Grands Interprètes - Tradition Classique de l'Iran II, Le Târ (CD, Ref. Harmonia Mundi No.

1901031), France. The CD edition of the Record Ref. Harmonia Mundi No. 1031, listed above: Improvisation in Shur - Improvisation in Mahour (D. Talai, Tar / D.Chemirani, Zarb).

- 1993 Performance of Radif of Mirza Ahdollah on the Setar in France (5 CDs) Al Sur.

Vol 1 Dastgah-e Shur, Avaz-e Bayat-e Kord Vol 2 Avaz-e Dashti, Avaz-e Bayat-e Esfahan, Dastgah-e Homayoun Vol 3 Dastgah-e Nava, Dastgah-e Segah, Avaz-e Afshari Vol 4 Dastgah-e Mahour, Avaz-e Bayat-e Tork Vol 5 Dastgah-e Tchahargah, Dastgah-e Rast-Panjgah

- 1997 Performance on Tar (in Iran) : Sayeh Roshan.

In Nava (D.Talai, Tar).

- 1998 Performance on Setar (in Iran) : Tchahargah.

In Tchahargah (D.Talai, Setar).

- 1998 Dariush Talai en concert - Concert of Utrecht August 30, 1996 (CD), Al Sur.

1-Sâyé roshan (in Dashti) 2-Hekâyat1 (in Abou ata) 3-Yorghé (in Abou ata) 4-Naghmé (in Abou ata) 5-Hekâyat2 (in Neyshabourak and Nava) 6-Jamal (in Khojaste) 7-Khâb (in Forud bé Nava) 8-Aqiq (in Nava) 9-Elam (in Nava) 10-Sahari (in Nava) 11-Lâbé (in Nava) 12-Koubé (in Nahoft and Neyshabourak) 13-Anjâm (in Forud bé Nava) 14-Shâdegâni.

- 2004 Vocal Calligraphy - The art of classical Persian song

Dariush Talai, Tar - Ali Reza Ghorbani, Vocal - Djamchid Chemirani, Zarb Abou'Ata : 1-Pishdaramad 2-Daramad 3-Hejaz 4-Tasnif. Nasimeh Sahar 5-Bayate Kord 6-Tasnif. Bahare delkash. Homayun : 1-Pishdaramad 2-Daramad 3-Chakavak 4-Bidad 5-Oj 6-Razavi 7-Tasnif. Jelve ye gol.

- 2005 Great Mediterranean masters, Dariush Talai, Tar and Setar, 1-Dastgâh Mâhur 2-Dastgâh Navâ 3-Âvaz Esfehân 4-Dastgâh Shur 5-Dastgâh Segâh
