= Tar (string instrument) =

Iranian string instrument

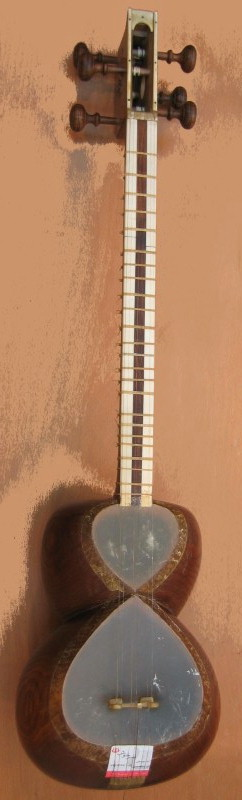

String instrument
- Classification: Plucked

Playing range
- (Shoor tuning)

Related instruments
- Choghur; Guitar; Oud; Rebab; Setar; Tanbur

The tar (Persian: تار [t̪ʰɒːɹ], lit. 'string') is an Iranian string instrument in the lute family, used by many cultures and countries in West Asia, Central Asia, and the Caucasus, including Iran, Azerbaijan, Uzbekistan, Georgia, Armenia, Tajikistan, and Turkey.

It is characterized by the long neck and hourglass shape of the body, and was originally known as the chahartar (چهارتار) or chartar (چارتار), which translates into Persian as 'four-stringed'. This is in accordance with a practice common in Persian-speaking areas of distinguishing lutes on the basis of the number of strings originally employed.

Beside the chartar, these include the dutar (دوتار; 'two-stringed'), setar (سه‌تار; 'three-stringed'), panjtar (پنج‌تار; 'five-stringed'), and the shashtar (شش‌تار; 'six-stringed').

It was revised into its current sound range in the 18th century and has since remained one of the most important musical instruments in Iran and the Caucasus, particularly in Persian music, while Azerbaijani music uses the Azerbaijani tar. It is the favoured instrument for radifs and mughams.

== Physical characteristics ==
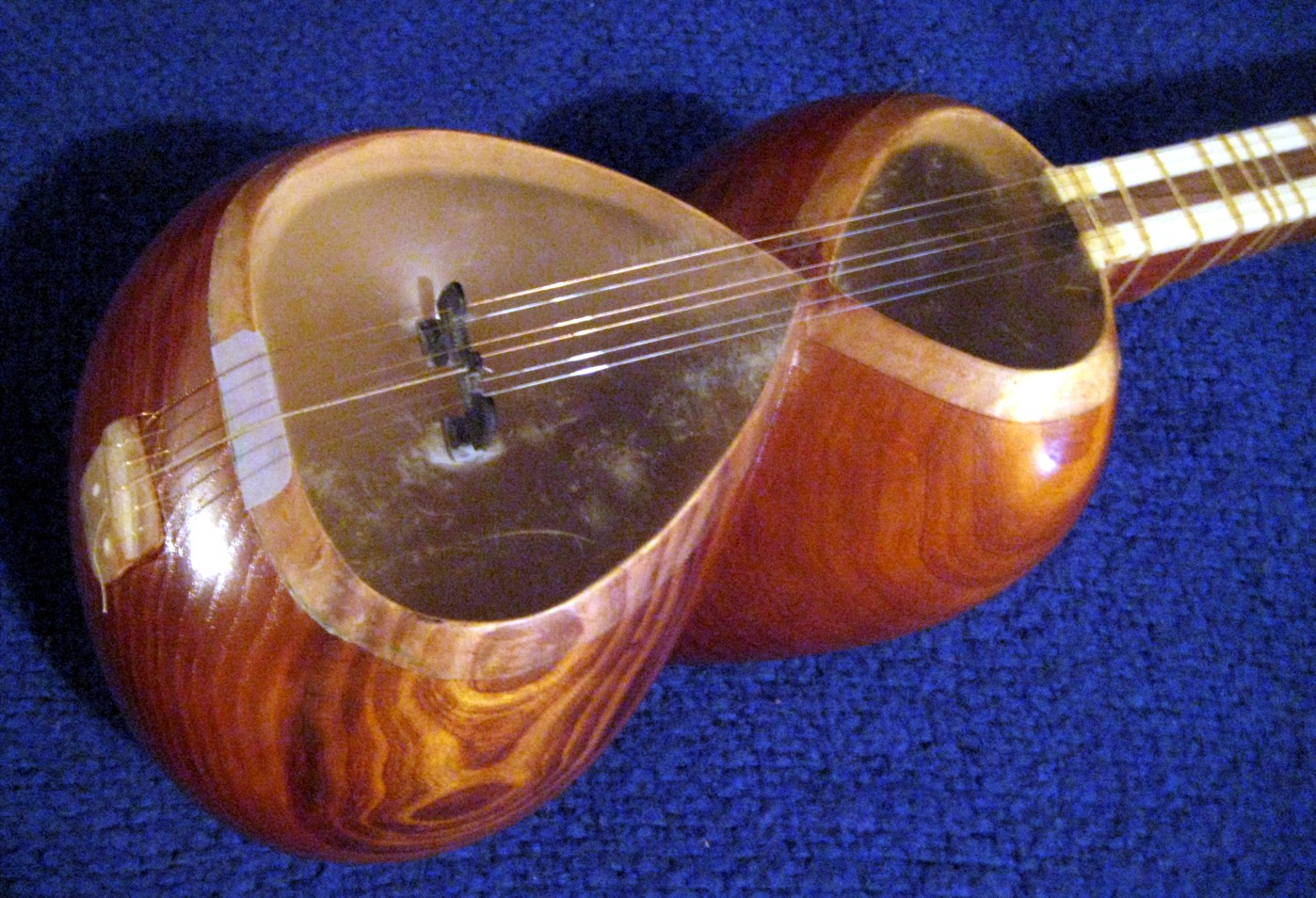
Front view of tar body

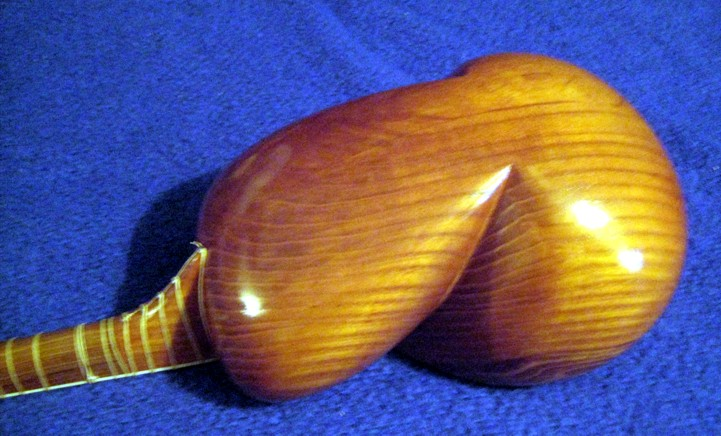
Back view of tar body

The most easily identifiable feature is the double-bowl shaped body carved from mulberry wood, with a thin membrane covering the top. The membrane is of stretched lamb-skin in the Persian tar, or the pericardium of an ox in the Azerbaijani (or Caucasian) tar. The fingerboard has twenty-five to twenty-eight adjustable gut frets. The Persian tar has three double courses of strings and a range of about two and one-half octaves. The Caucasian tar has 11 strings in five paired courses plus a bass drone.

The long and narrow neck has a flat fingerboard running level to the membrane and ends in an elaborate pegbox with six/11 wooden tuning pegs of different dimensions, adding to the decorative effect.

=== The strings of the Persian tar ===
It has three courses of double "singing" strings (each pair tuned in unison: the first two courses in plain steel, the third in wound copper), that are tuned root, fifth, octave (C, G, C), plus one "flying" bass string (wound in copper and tuned to G, an octave lower than the singing middle course) that runs outside the fingerboard and passes over an extension of the nut. Every string has its own tuning peg and are tuned independently.

The Persian tar used to have five strings. The sixth string was added to the tar by Darvish Khan. This string is today's fifth string of the Iranian tar.

=== Modes of play ===
The instrument is held high on the breast, plucked at the centre of the body using a small brass plectrum known in Persian/Azerbaijani as a mezrab/mizrab. That is held in the right hand and used in a combination of upstrokes (alt) and downstrokes (üst) along with occasional tremolos in both directions. Meanwhile the notes are selected by the placing of the fingers of the left hand, with notes sometimes bent by a motion of the placed finger as in blues guitar.

The addition of an unplucked note as a trill on top of the plucked bass note is known in Azerbaijani as lal barmaq – literally "muted finger"., while a somewhat similar effect called jirmag is achieved by using the fingernail to strike the string. This gives a more poignant 'scratching' sound.

== Azerbaijani tar ==
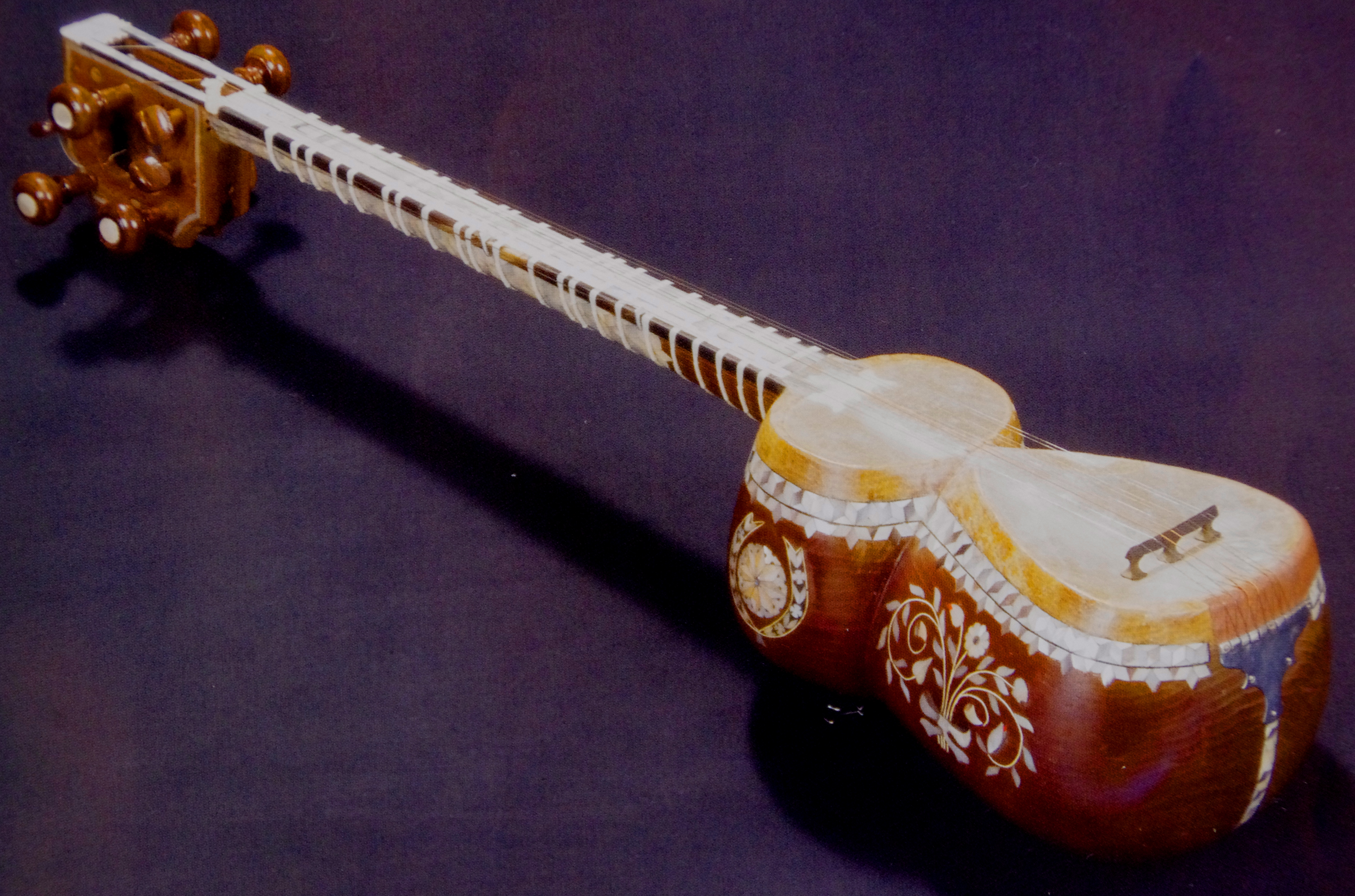
Azerbaijani tar

The Azerbaijani tar—or the Caucasus, Caucasian or the "11-string tar"—is a related instrument with a slightly differing shape from the Persian tar, and was developed from around 1870 by Sadigjan. It has a different build and utilizes more strings. The Azerbaijani tar features one extra bass string on the side, on a raised nut, and usually has two doubled resonance strings, held via small metal nuts halfway down the neck. These strings are all placed next to the main strings over the bridge and are fixed to a string-holder and the edge of the body, somewhat like the Indian sitar's rhythm strings. Overall, the Azerbaijani tar has 11 playing strings and 17 tones. It is considered the national instrument of Azerbaijan.

According to the Encyclopædia Iranica, Azeri art music is also performed in other regions of the Caucasus, mainly among Armenians who have adopted the mugham repertoire and its associated instruments (such as the kamancheh and tar).

A tar is depicted on the reverse side of the Azerbaijani one-qəpik coin (minted since 2006) and on the obverse of the Azerbaijani one-manat banknote (also issued since 2006).

In 2012, the craftsmanship, tradition and performance of the tar in Azerbaijan was added to UNESCO's Intangible Cultural Heritage of Humanity list.

== Music and Healing ==
The melodies performed on tar were considered useful for headache, insomnia and melancholy, as well as for eliminating nervous and muscle spasms. Listening to this instrument was believed to induce a quiet and philosophical mood, compelling the listener to reflect upon life. Its solemn melodies were thought to cause a person to relax and fall asleep.

The author of Qabusnameh (11th century) recommends that when selecting musical tones (pardeh), to take into account the temperament of the listener (see Four temperaments). He suggested that lower pitched tones (bam) were effective for persons of sanguine and phlegmatic temperaments, while higher pitched tones (zeer) were helpful for those who were identified with a choleric temperament or melancholic temperament.

== Use in contemporary music ==
The tar features prominently in Jeff Wayne's Musical Version of The War of the Worlds, in the section "Horsell Common and the Heat Ray". George Fenton played tar on the original album, and Gaetan Schurrer can be seen playing one on the DVD of the 2006 production.

== Gallery ==
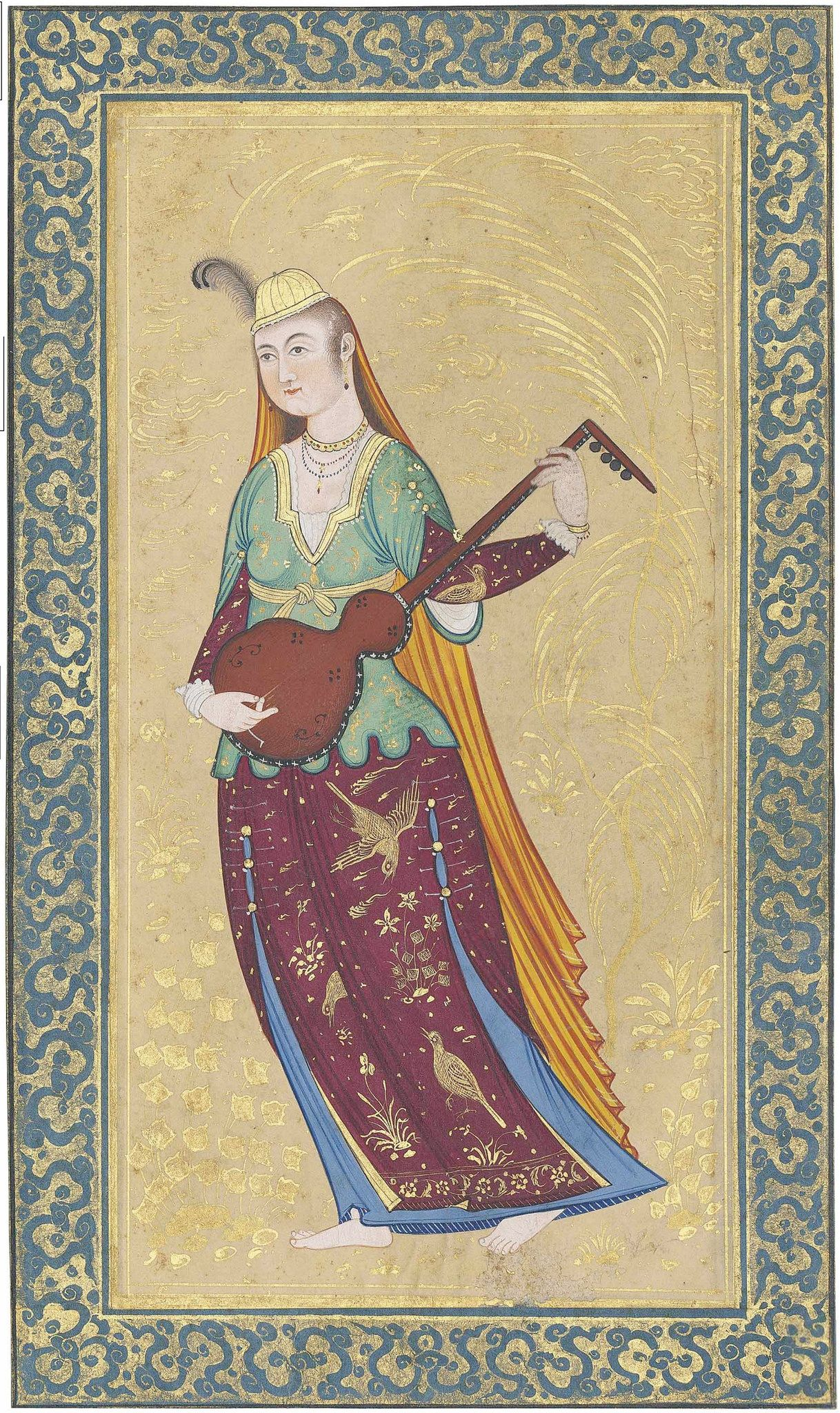
Qajar-era portrait (in Safavid style) of a female musician playing a tar.

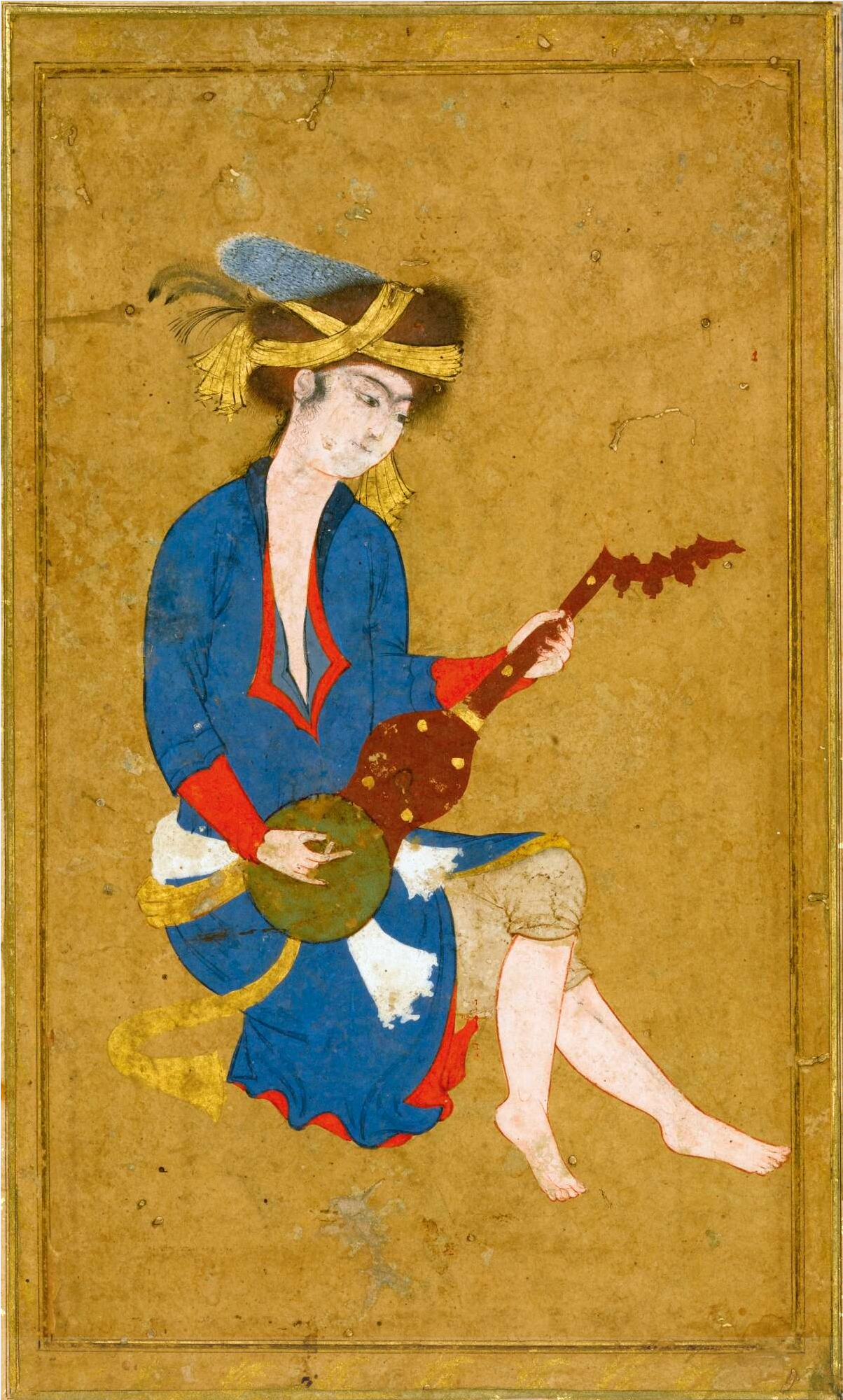
Young man with Iranian rubab (16th cent.), Safavid Empire. The figure-eight shape resembles a tar, but only one side is covered with hide; on the tar, both sides of the instrument are covered in hide. Rubabs had a lower section covered with hide, and an upper, hollow section covered with wood.

== See also ==
- Music of Azerbaijan
- Music of Iran
