= Tomb of Seyed Alaeddin Husayn =

Funerary monument and mosque in Shiraz, Iran

Emamzadeh Alaeddin Hossein
- امامزاده علاءالدین حسین
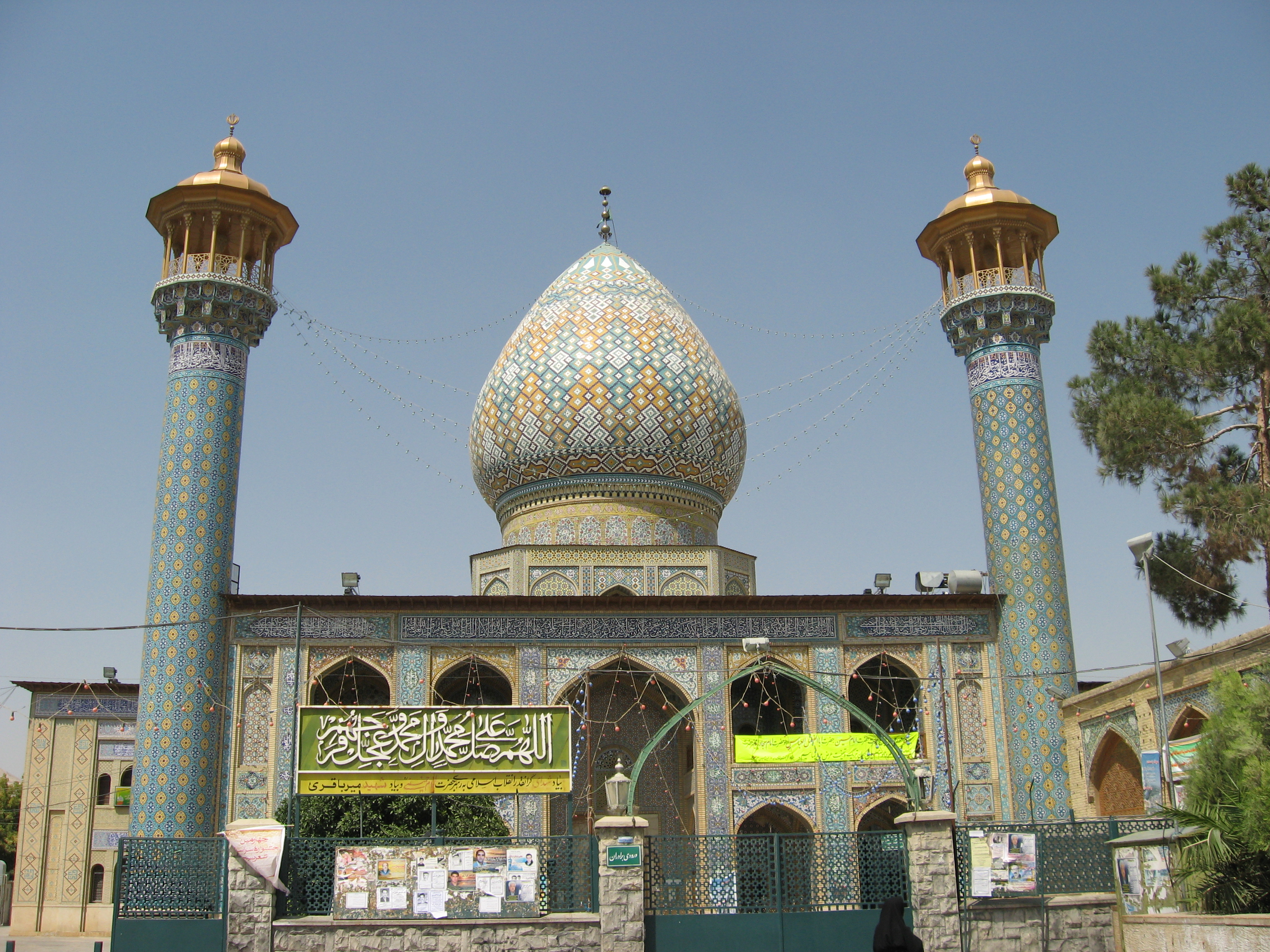
- The dome and minarets of the mausoleum in 2007

- Location of the mausoleum in Iran

Religion
- Affiliation: Islam
- Branch/tradition: Shia (Twelver)
- Ecclesiastical or organisational status: Mausoleum and mosque
- Status: Active

Location
- Location: Shiraz, Fars
- Country: Iran
- Interactive map of Emamzadeh Alaeddin Hossein
- Coordinates: 29°36′19.1″N 52°32′55.2″E

Architecture
- Type: Mosque architecture
- Style: Safavid; Iranian
- Completed: Safavid era 14th century CE

Specifications
- Dome: One (maybe more)
- Minaret: Two
- Shrine: One (Alaeddin Hossein)
- Materials: Bricks; mirrored ceramic tiles

Iran National Heritage List
- Official name: Emamzadeh Alaeddin Hossein
- Type: Emamzadeh
- Designated: 1937
- Reference no.: 307
- Conservation organization: Cultural Heritage, Handicrafts and Tourism Organization of Iran

The Emamzadeh Alaeddin Hossein (Persian: امامزاده علاءالدین حسین), also known as the Imamzadeh Husayn (Shiraz), is a Twelver Shi'ite mausoleum and mosque complex that contains a shrine, located in south-east Shiraz, in the province of Fars, Iran. Constructed in the 10th century of the Islamic calendar, the mausoleum houses the remains of Sayyid Ala'ed-Din Husayn, son of Imam Musa al-Kazim, and brother of Sayyid Ahmad (whose shrine is also in Shiraz). The mausoleum complex was added to the Iran National Heritage List on 20 December 1937, administered by the Cultural Heritage, Handicrafts and Tourism Organization of Iran. The complex is a holy site in Shia Islam.

== Overview ==
The exterior of the complex appears similar to most Safavid style mosques. The interior, however, is quite unusual in that the interior of the arches, walls and dome are covered in intricate mosaics of mirror and colored glass shines of various shades of green, blue, yellow and white colors, that create an unusual light combination.

As a result of soil instability and earthquakes in Shiraz, the complex has suffered considerable damage of the centuries. Part of the dome, which was repaired by the late Mirza Abu'l-Hasan Moshiro'l-molk, gave way and was threatened with collapse. Despite repairs and much reinforcement, in 1950 the dome was removed by the Fars Department of Education. In 1952 a dome of lesser weight, with an interior iron structure, was installed.

== History of the tomb ==
Seyed Alaeddin Hussein, also known as "Hussein Musa" and "Little Hussein", is said to have been the youngest brother of the eighth Shiite Imam, Ali ibn Musa al-Rida. Sayyid Alauddin Hussein is the son of the seventh Imam of the Shiites, Musa al-Kazim. He was killed in Shiraz by the soldiers of al-Ma'mun in the late 2nd century AH while traveling from Medina to Tus. It is reported that he was struck from behind with a sword while performing ablution at the foot of a stream in a garden, resulting in his death, although he was between 19 and 23 years old at the time. Some accounts suggest that Sayyid Alauddin Hussein was thirteen years old when he was killed. However, this theory has faced criticism; Considering the death of Musa al-Kazim, the seventh Imam of the Shiites, in 183 AH and the visit of the eighth Imam of the Shiites, Ali ibn Musa al-Rida, to Iran around 200 or 201 AH, it is argued that Sayyid Alauddin Hussein must have been at least twenty years old at the time of his martyrdom.

According to various sources, he was buried in the same garden where he was killed, remaining unmarked until a tomb was constructed over his grave approximately 400 years later. It is said that the ruler of Persia at that time, Abu Bakr ibn Sa'd, who lived during the Mongol rule over Iran and was appointed by Hulegu Khan as the head of Persia, ordered the construction of this tomb. Consequently, the date of this monument can be traced back to the Atabakan period, specifically the late 7th or early 8th century AH. This tomb is situated in a neighborhood known as "Aas'taaneh" in the southeast of the city of Shiraz in Iran.

In another account, it is reported that a wealthy man named "Mirza Ali" relocated from Medina to Shiraz, where he constructed a dome and a grand courtyard over the grave of Sayyid Alauddin. This man also acquired numerous houses and gardens surrounding the tomb, dedicating them all to its preservation. Following "Mirza Ali's" death, the responsibility for this endowed tomb was passed to his son "Mirza Nizam al-Mulk", who served as a minister. Subsequently, this responsibility was inherited by his descendants. Additionally, it is noted that "Sultan Khalil", the ruler of Shiraz acting on behalf of Shah Ismail Safavi, destroyed the tomb in the year 810 AH, only to later renovate and complete it.

After some time, this tomb was once again destroyed by an earthquake that struck Shiraz. It is said that a man named "Abul Hassan Khan Moshir al-Mulk", who served as the minister of Persia, ordered the restoration of the building and oversaw its reconstruction.

In his book "Asar-e Ajam", Forsat-od-Dowleh Shirazi states about the history of the tomb:

According to my research, that noble man was martyred in the garden of "Qotlugh". Over time, the garden was destroyed, leaving no remains. During the Safavid era, the tomb of Seyyed Alauddin was discovered. Mirza Ali, a man from Medina who had traveled to Shiraz, constructed a building over that grave and endowed numerous properties and objects to the tomb of that Imam. Sultan Khalil, the ruler of Shiraz, repaired the tomb and expanded its structure on behalf of Shah Ismail Safavi. The date of this construction is inscribed above the door on the front side, stating: building was erected during the reign of Sultan Khalil in the year 923 AH.

Currently, there are two entrances to this tomb, both of which were adorned with mirrors in 1338 AH. Additionally, two pairs of marquetried doors have been installed. The walls of the rooms and the veranda were covered in marble up to a height of 2 meters in 1345 AH. Furthermore, in recent years, a beautifully crafted gold door, created by artists from Isfahan, has been prepared and installed for this tomb using funds donated specifically for this purpose.

In recent years, the dome of this tomb, which was originally very thick and heavy, collapsed. In 1330 AH, the Archaeological Department dismantled the dome and subsequently rebuilt it using an iron skeleton. Currently, the dome is adorned with mosaic tiles, and the dome's base is decorated with colorful floral and patterned tiles.

In recent years, a portico has been constructed in front of the shrine's doors, featuring tiles on the interior and overhead. Additionally, a mosque has been established in the southeast corner of the courtyard, and a clock tower has been erected in the southwest.

Cities in Iran, including Kerman, Behbahan, Qazvin, Sari, and Kojur, are noted as potential burial sites of Seyyed Alaeddin Hussein. While other cities, such as Kufa, also have tombs associated with this shrine, none possess as many authentic written records and historical documents as the one located in Shiraz.

== Gallery ==
Photos of the tomb of Seyed Alauddin Hossein
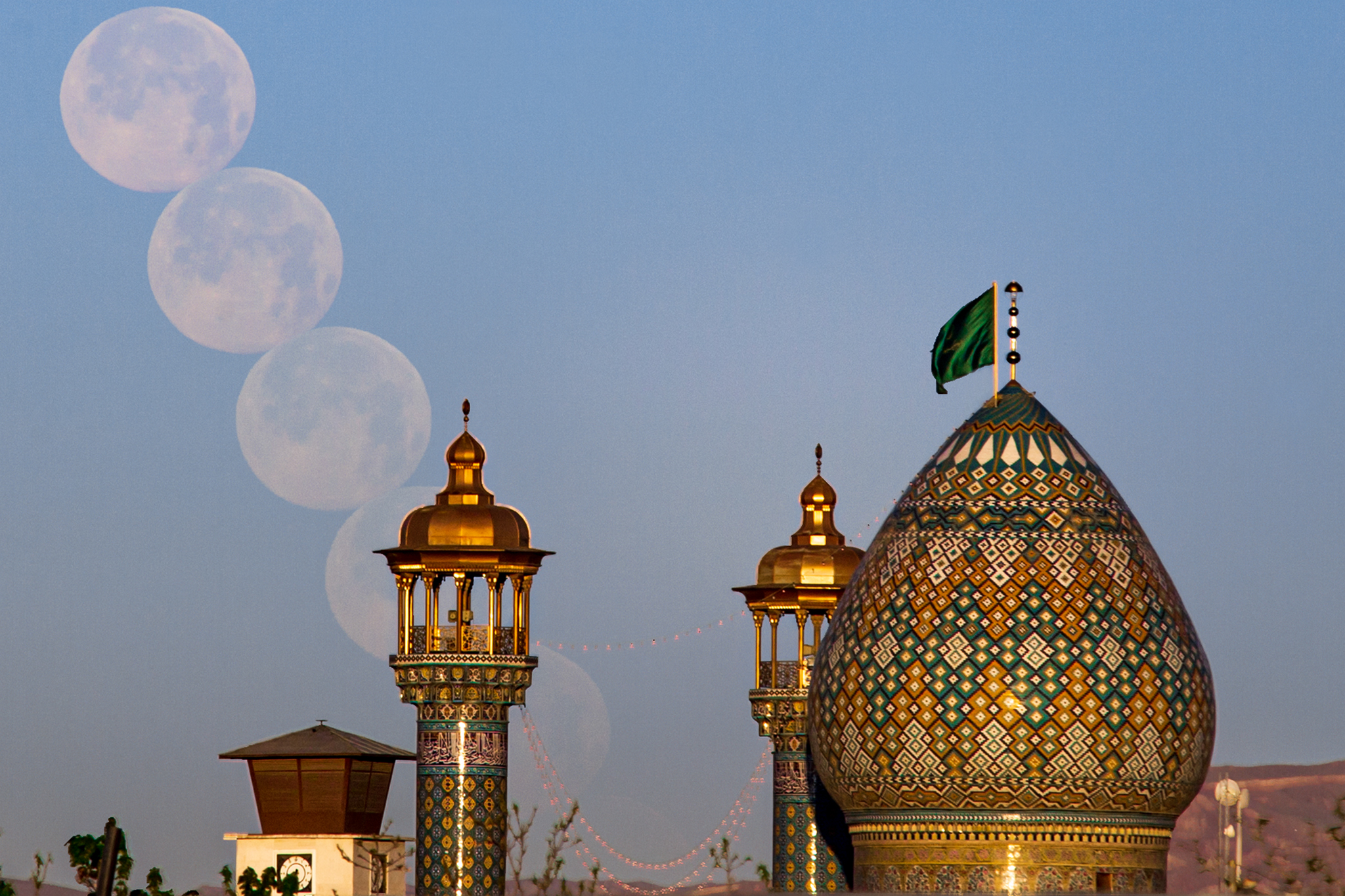
Dome and minarets of the tomb of Sayyid Alauddin Hussein

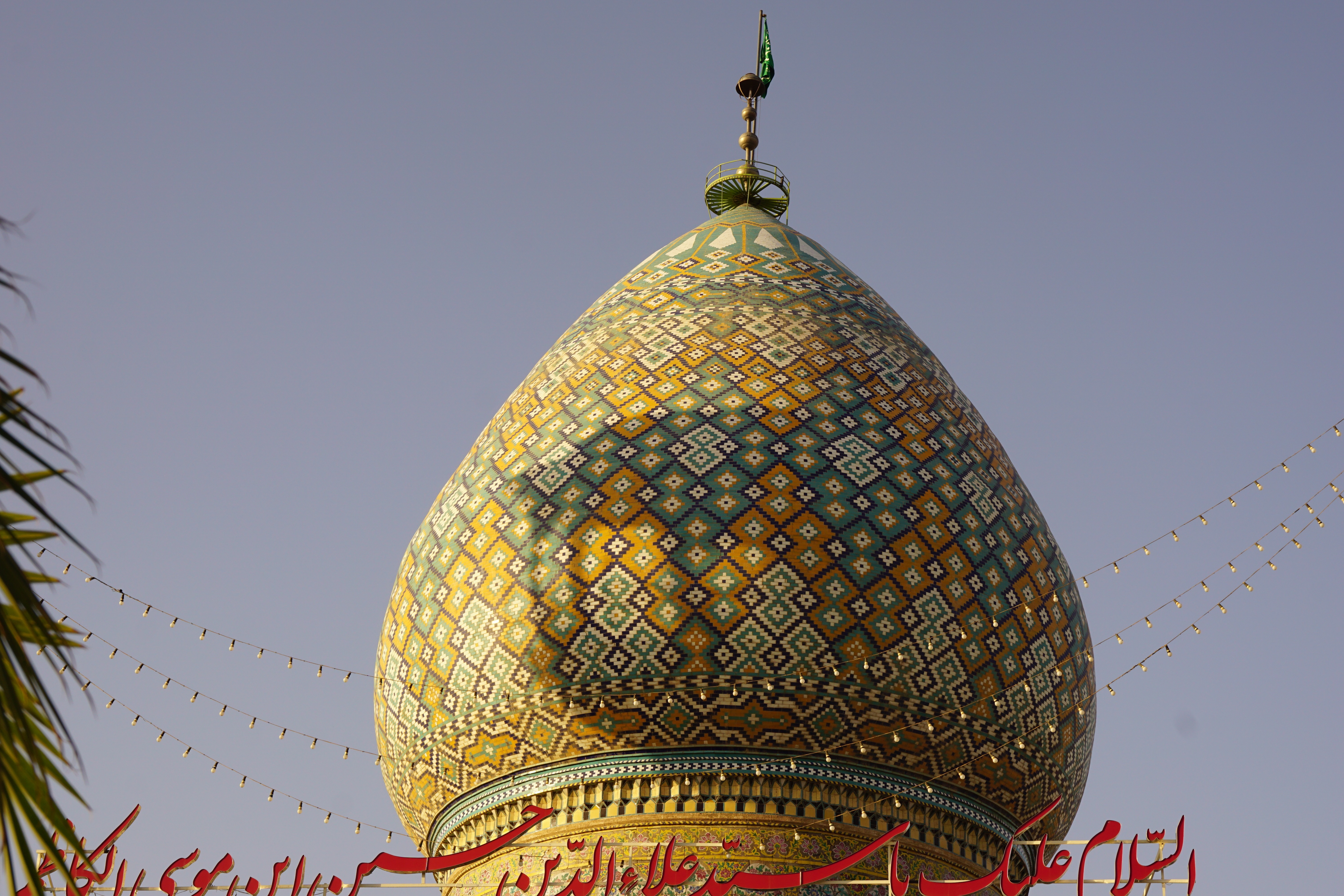
The dome of the tomb of Seyed Alaeddin Husayn

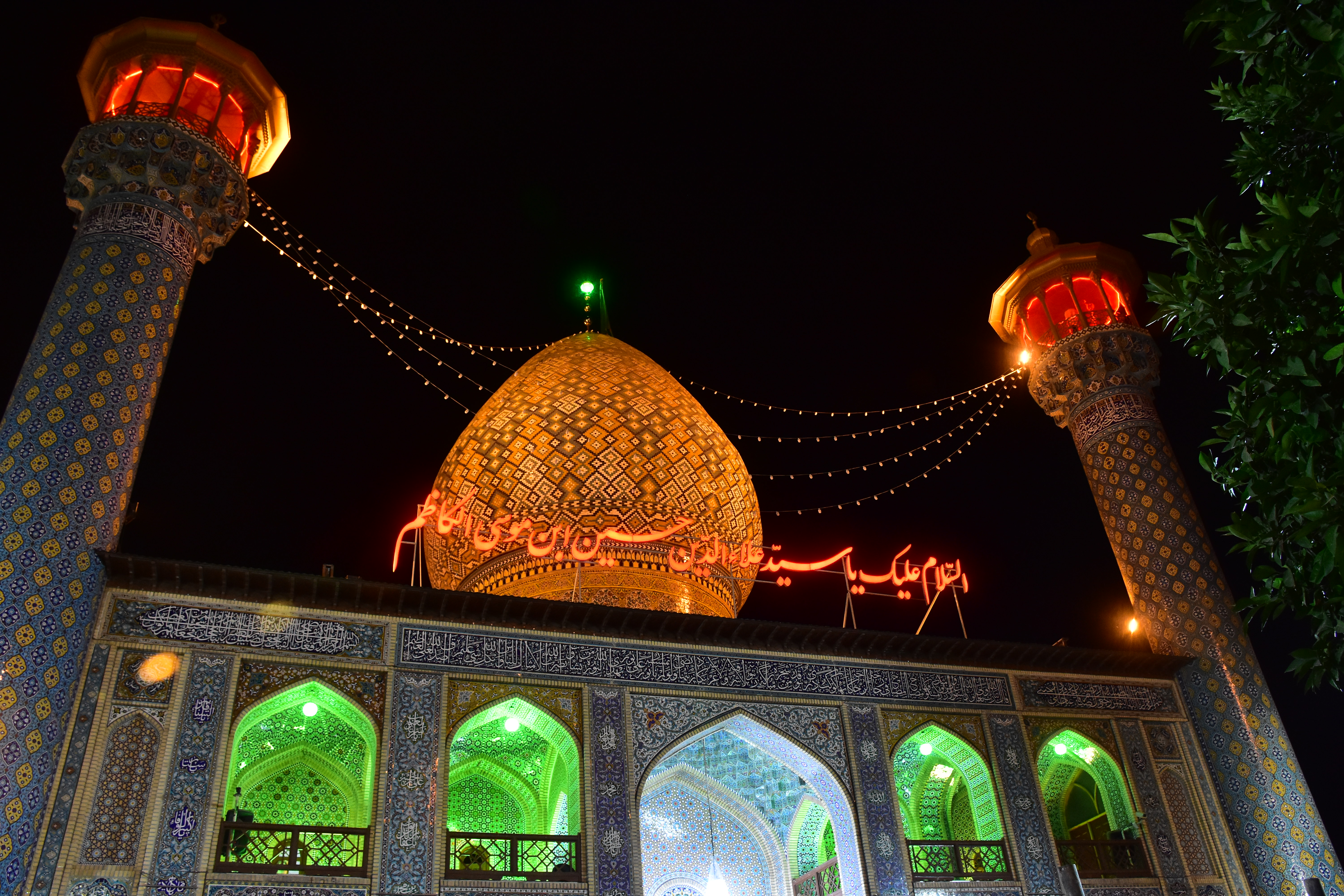
Tomb of Seyed Alaeddin Husayn at night

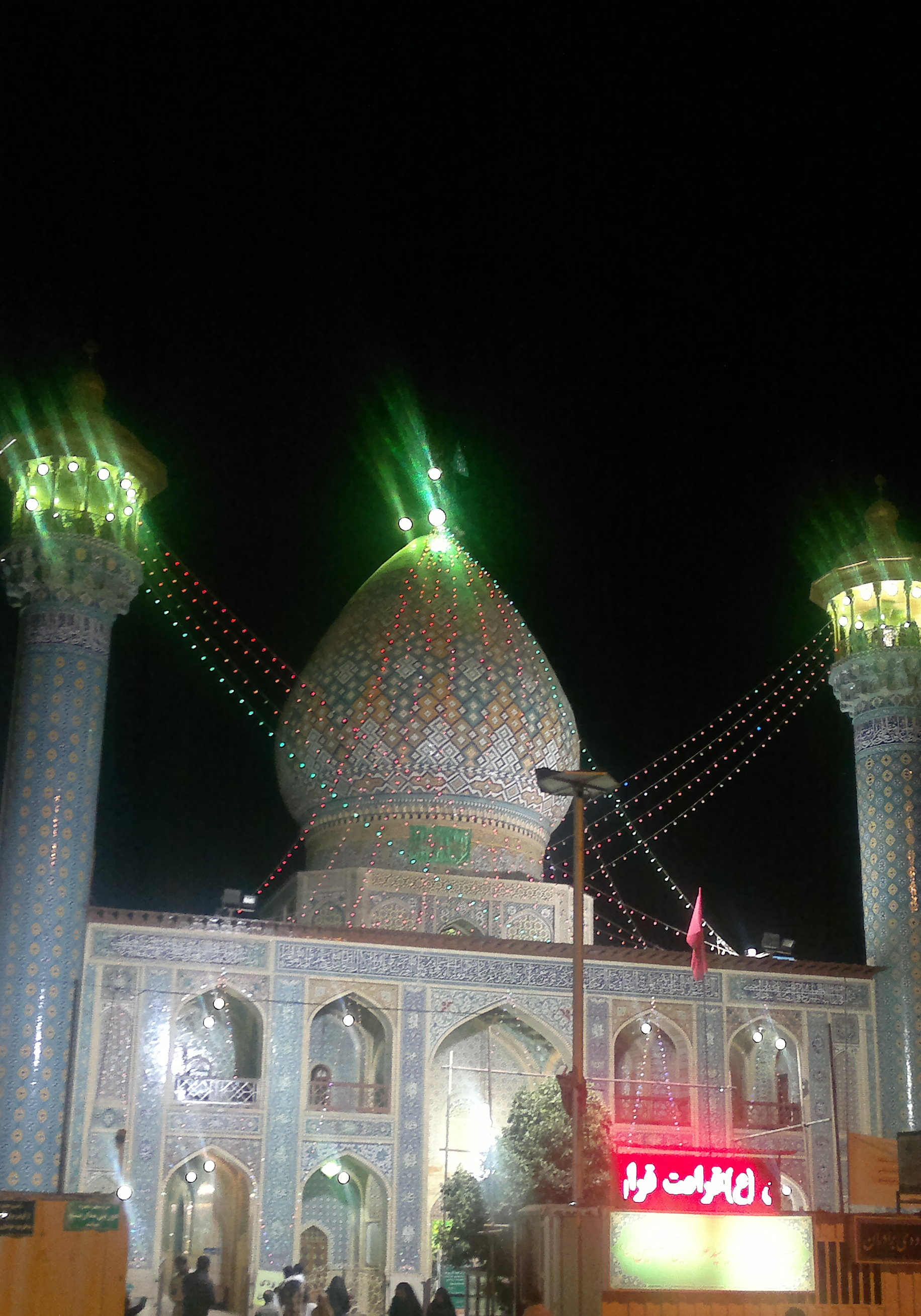
Seyyed Alauddin Hossein's tomb at night

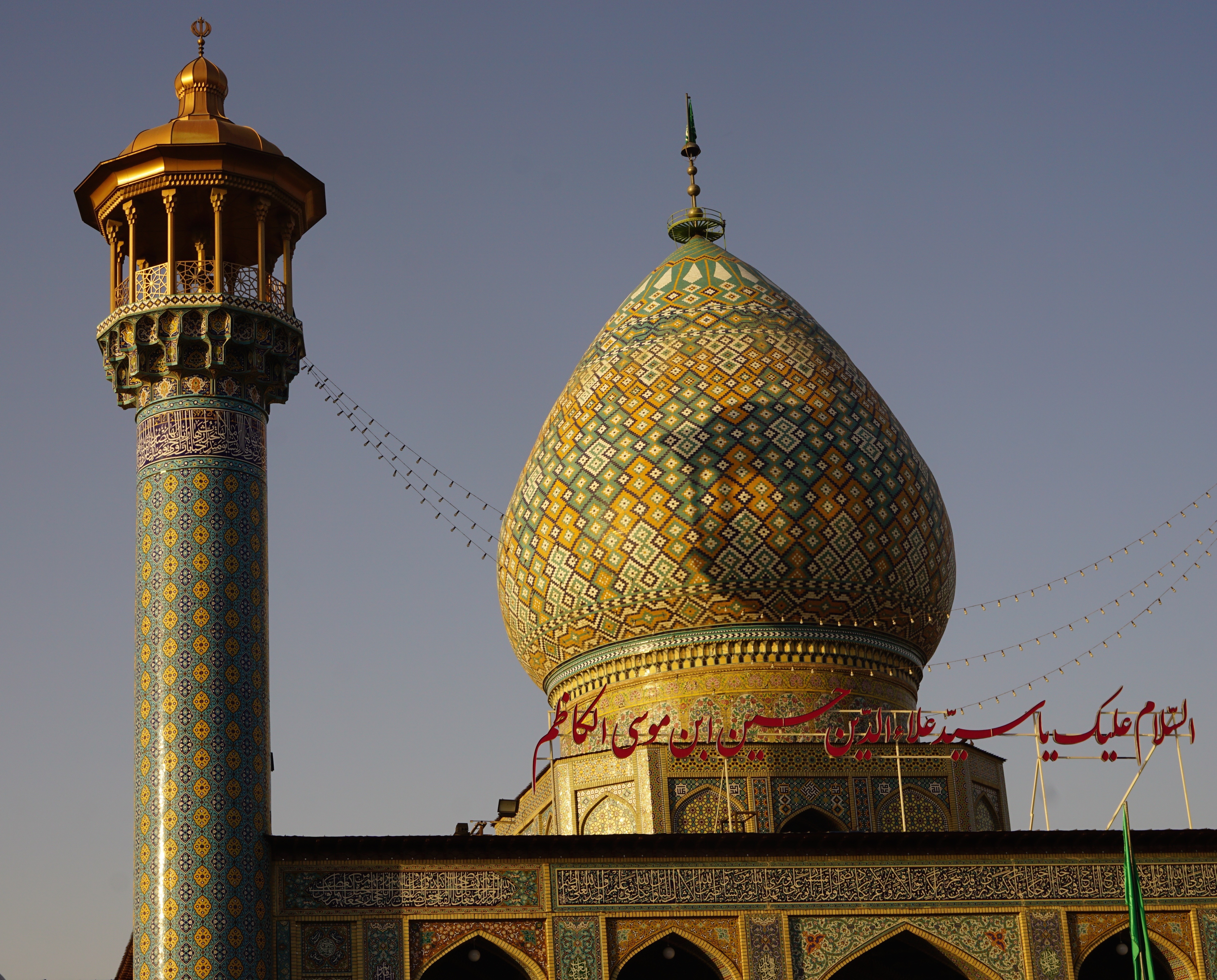
A picture of the dome and minaret of the tomb of Sayyid Alauddin Hussein

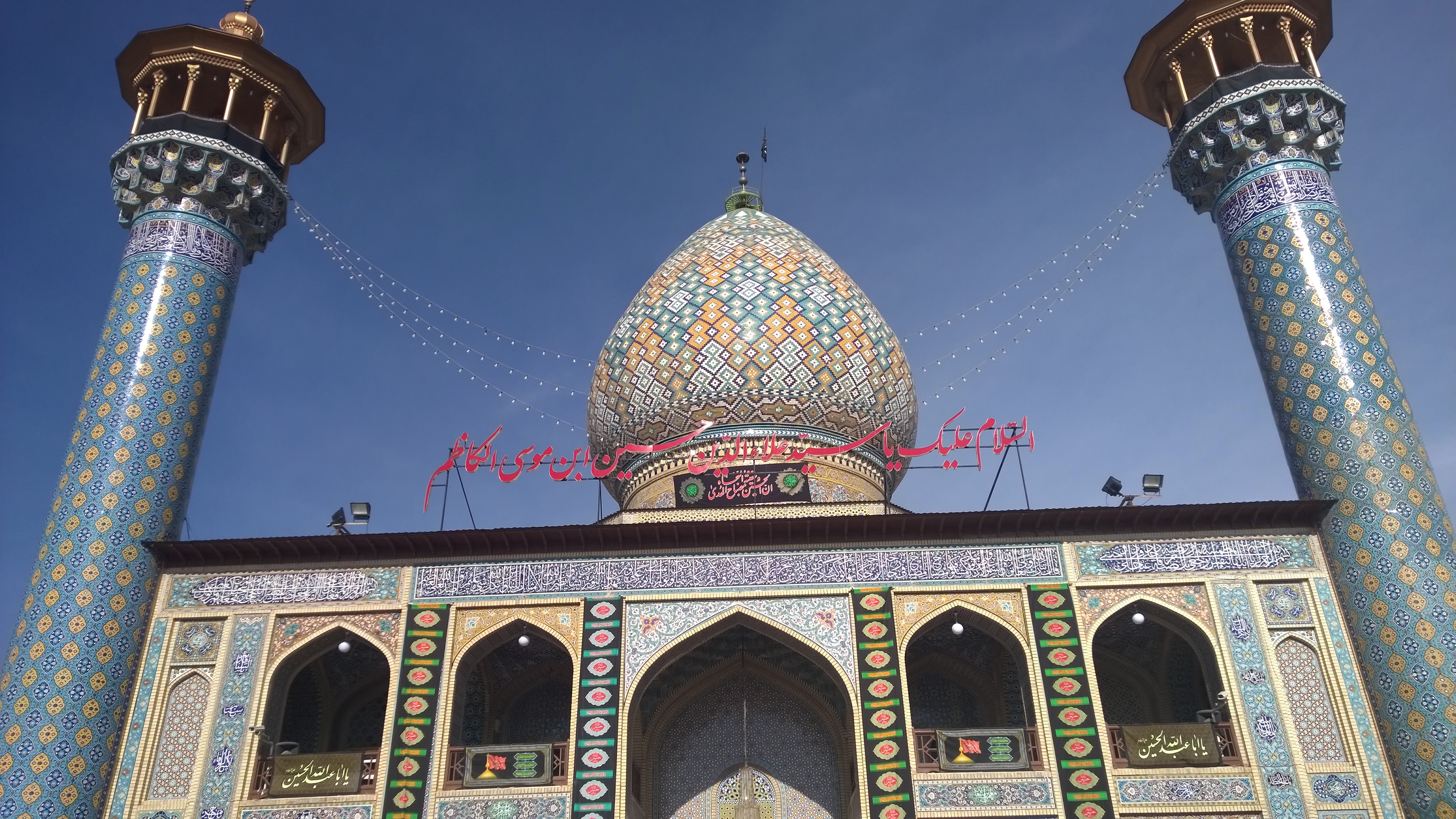
Horizontal view of the tomb of Sayyid Alauddin Hussein

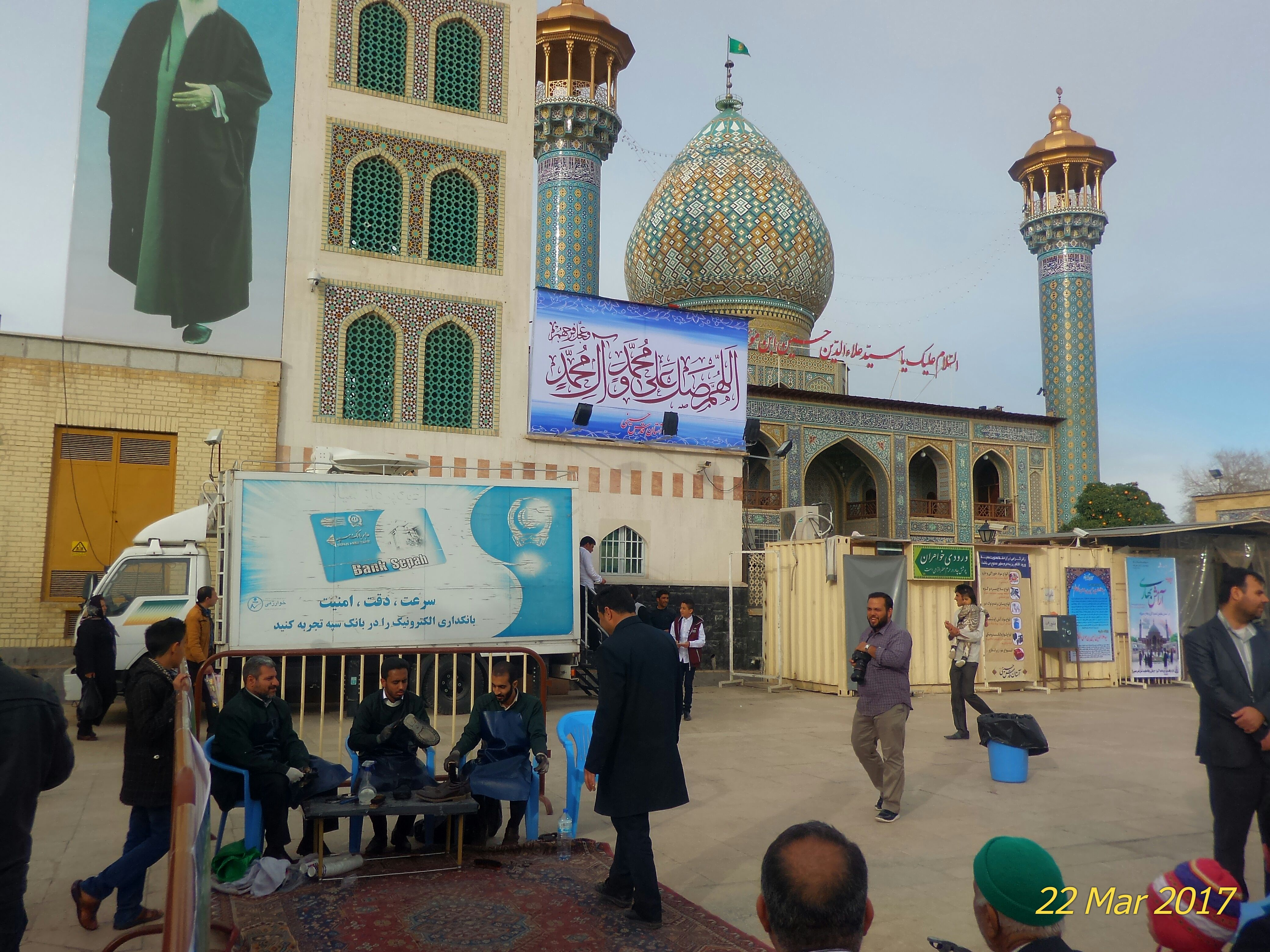
Waxing pilgrims' shoes by volunteer servants at the tomb of Sayyid Alauddin Hussein

== See also ==
- Al-Rashid Mausoleum
- Imamzadeh Ali ibn Jafar
- Mausoleum of Awn ibn Ali
- Imamzadeh Chaharmanar
- Darb-e Imam
- Fatima Masumeh Shrine
- Imamzadeh Hamzeh, Kashmar
- Imamzadeh Hamzah, Tabriz
- Imamzadeh Ismail and Shayah Mosque
- Imamzadeh Seyed Mohammad
- Shah Abdol-Azim Shrine
- Shia Islam in Iran
- List of imamzadehs in Iran
- List of mosques in Iran
- Holiest sites in Shia Islam
- Persian domes
