= Afagh =

Afagh is a surname. Notable people with the surname include:

- Behrouz Afagh, Iranian journalist
- Hamed Afagh (born 1983), Iranian basketball player
- Kaveh Afagh (born 1983), Iranian singer, songwriter, arranger, and guitarist

== See also ==
- Afagh (newspaper)
- Afash
