= Nazar Garden =

Historic garden in Kazerun, Iran

- باغ نظر (Persian); Bāgh-e Nazar (Persian)
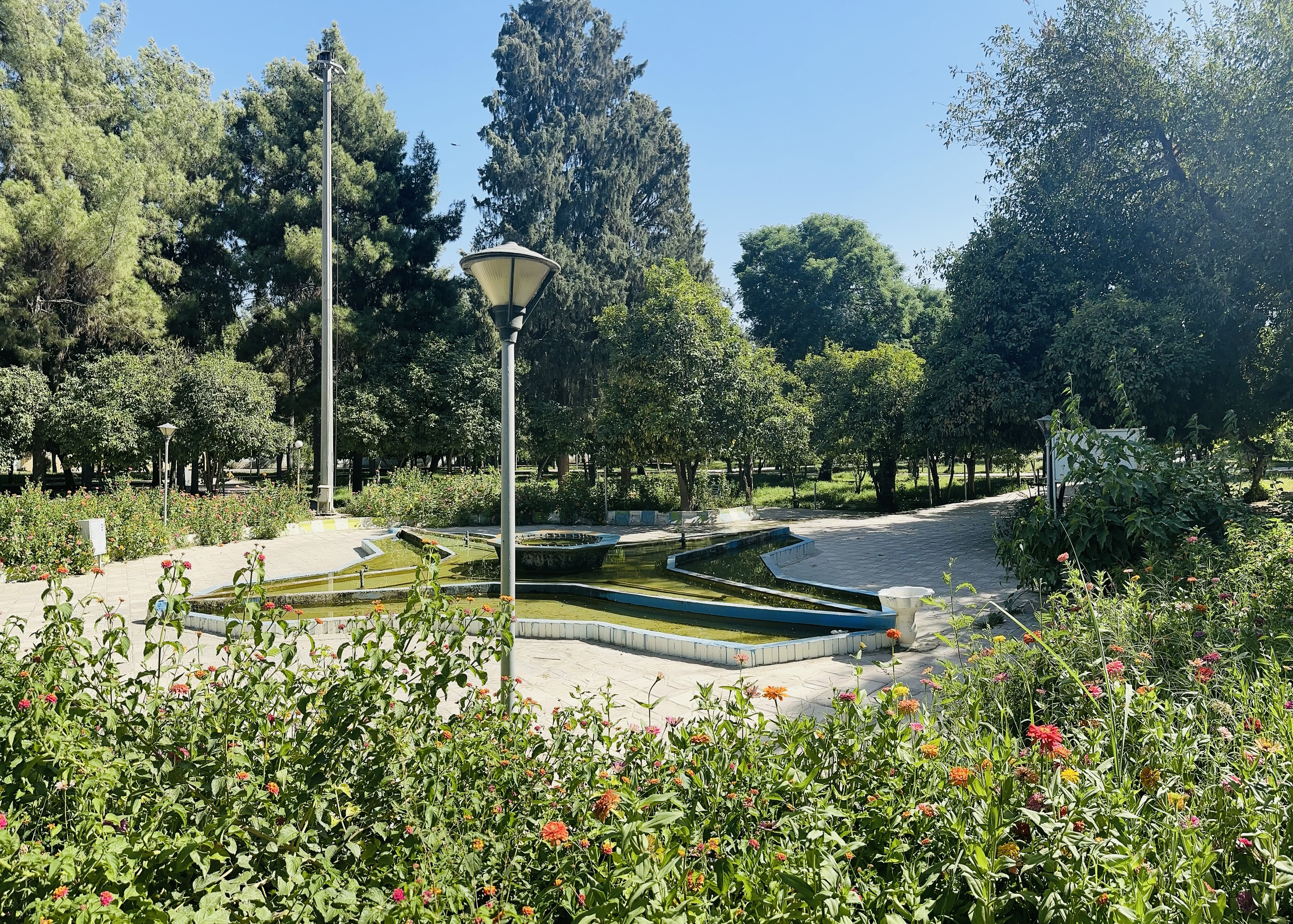
- Interactive map of Nazar Garden
- 29°37′02″N 51°38′41″E
- Location: Kazerun, Iran

History
- Founded: 1737
- Built: Khajeh Ali Qoli Khan Afshar, Ruler of Kazerun

Site notes
- Area: 5 acres (2.0 ha)
- Governing body: Kazerun Municipality

Nazar Garden (Persian: باغ نظر, romanized: Bāgh-e Nazar) is one of the historical gardens of Iran, which is located in the city of Kazerun and is considered one of the tourist attractions and historical places of this city. This garden was created by Khajeh Ali Qoli Khan Afshar, the ruler of Kazerun in the Afsharid era in the year 1737, in the southwest of the city of Kazerun. Throughout history, Nazar Garden has been a place of rest and reception and a dormitory for many kings and princes, governors, elders and other dignitaries of Iran, Fars region and foreign countries.

== Location and Current Situation ==
At the beginning of its establishment, Nazar Garden was located a short distance from the southwest of Kazerun city. Later, with the expansion of the city, this garden was included in the city limits. The initial area of the garden was about 5 hectares, which was later reduced to 3.5 hectares due to the change of use of parts of the garden. Nazar Garden is now located in the area of Mosalla neighborhood of Kazerun, and its entrance is through Hafez Street. The current owner of the garden is Kazerun municipality. This garden also hosts the Kazerun environment house.

== History ==
The construction of Nazar Garden was the idea of Khajeh Hessam al-Din Afshar, one of the rulers of Kazerun during the Safavid and Afsharid eras. But in the end, Khajeh Ali Qoli Khan Afshar, the grandson of his brother, who later became the ruler of Kazarun, laid the foundation for the construction of Nazar Garden in 1737 AD. He built Nazar Garden in the form of four streets that intersect in the form of a crossroad. The main trees of the garden were Bitter oranges and Aegle marmelos.

=== Denomination ===
There are two ideas about the reason for naming Nazar Garden. One idea explains the name of Nazar Garden in this way that if we convert the word "Nazar" to Abjad letters, the year of construction of this garden (1150 A.H.) is obtained. Nevertheless, Bastani Parizi, an Iranian historian, has a different opinion in this regard. He believes that this garden was public and a place to see, view, watch and entertain people, and in fact, it was a city park, and for this reason, it was known as Nazar (means See).

=== Mansion ===
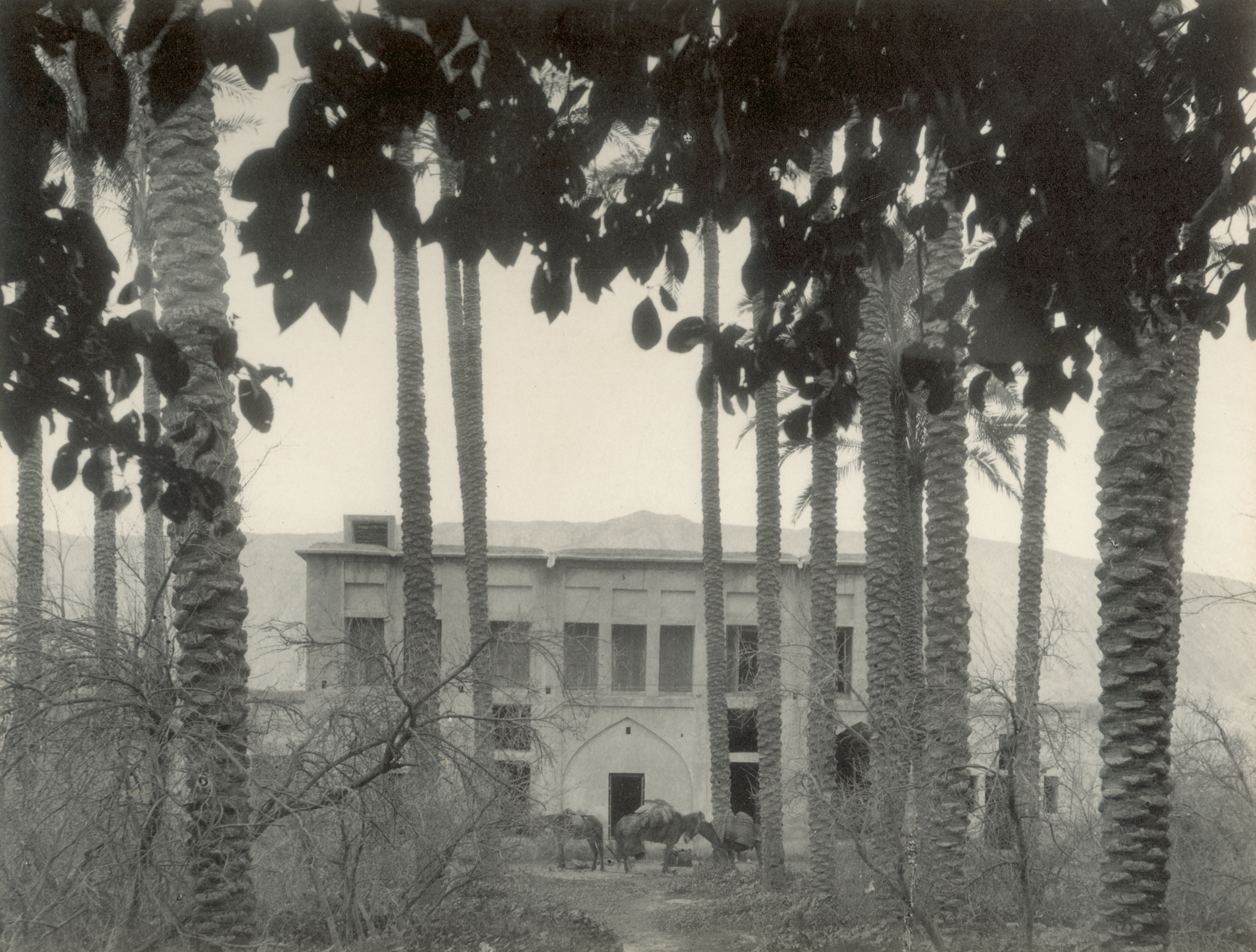
An image of the historical mansion of Nazar Garden of Kazerun (photo storage: Rijksmuseum of Amsterdam - Netherlands)

In the past, this garden had a mansion with a special architecture, which was known as Nazar Garden Kūshk (Kiosk). However, this mansion was destroyed in the 1980s for unknown reasons.

=== Ab anbar ===
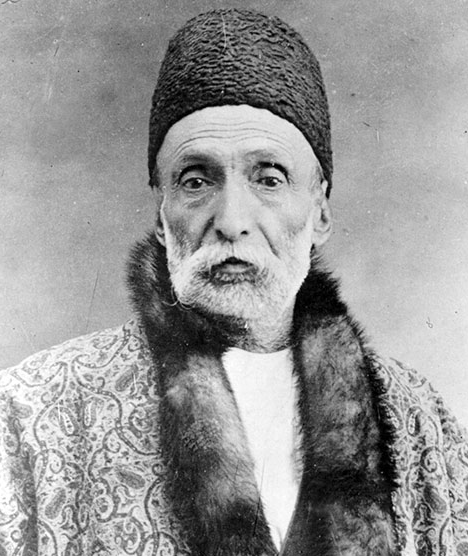
Hossein-Qoli Nezam al-Saltaneh Mafi, the prime minister and governor of Fars region at the time, who ordered the construction of the Ab anbar and the Pit of Nazar Garden.

In 1892, Hossein-Qoli Nezam al-Saltaneh Mafi, the prime minister of Iran during the reign of Mohammad Ali Shah Qajar, who was the governor of Fars region at that time, during his trip to Kazerun and staying in Nazar Garden, ordered the construction of a Ab anbar at the entrance of the garden. At that time, Izadi of Kazerun, a poet of the Qajar era, made the history of the Ab anbar's construction on a marble stone and installed it at the entrance of the Ab anbar. This Ab anbar was destroyed in 1975.

=== Pit of Nazar Garden ===
Simultaneously with the construction of the Ab anbar, Hossein-Qoli Nezam al-Saltaneh Mafi also ordered the construction of Pit of Nazar Garden. This pit was filled with water from the aqueduct and turned into a small artificial lake that was used to irrigate the garden. This pit later became dry and unused, and residential houses were built on it in the following years.

== Nazar Garden in the Works of Writers and Famous people ==
Hossein-Qoli Nezam al-Saltaneh Mafi, the Prime Minister of Iran during the reign of Mohammad Ali Shah Qajar, who ordered the construction of the Ab anbar and Pit of Nazar Garden, in a letter he wrote to his son in 1903, requested to preserve the Ab anbar of Nazar Garden, which is one of his relics. He writes about his stay in Nazar Garden in the book of Memories and Documents:

There, I gave instructions that Mirza Ali Khan Telegrafi, the grandson of the late Haj Zeyn al-Abedin Shirvani Qutb, should build a large Ab anbar and a residence with several rooms on top of it for the families of pilgrims who pass through there.

Sadr al-Sadat Kazeruni, the poet and writer of the Qajar era writes about this garden and other gardens of Kazerun in the book Āsār al-Rezā:

Good and high-quality trees with style, from fifty (or 150) years ago until now, planted in rows and closed, which the eyes of the world have never seen in Iran like Bitter orange Gardens of Kazarun, Gardens and Bitter orange Gardens.

Mohammad Ali Khan Sadid al-Saltaneh, a historian and writer of the Qajar era, who visited Nazar Garden in 1896, writes as follows:

Nazar Garden is a very good and famous garden and most of its trees are Bitter orange. It is watered by the water of Kheyrat. On both sides of the garden, there are two very good mansions. Now, government officials are sitting in it.

Forsat-od-Dowleh Shirazi, a poet and writer of the Qajar era writes about this garden in the book of Asar-e Ajam:

Nazar Garden of Kazerun is famous all over the world and this poor man lived in that garden for three days and three nights and I was happy with its bitter orange trees.

He writes elsewhere:

And close to the city is a garden called Nazar, which is very heart-warming and extremely life-enhancing. Its trees are all tall, strong bitter oranges, which are rare in Fars.

He also writes in Dabestan al-Forsat book:

At midnight, I left for Kazerun. I stayed and slept in Nazar Garden, which is one of the famous gardens of Iran, and its bitter orange trees are famous all over the world, I entered, left my luggage and was in that garden like heaven for a week.

Pirzadeh Naeeni, one of the intellectuals of the Qajar era, who visited Kazerun in 1888, writes about this garden:

Kazerun has a very good garden, which is called Nazar, and the history of the construction of that garden is the same as the word Nazar. All the trees there are Citrus. The streets of that garden are all bitter orange trees, and the text of the garden is from the Aegle marmelos tree, which is called Bekraei talkheh in Kazerun. It also has some pomegranate trees and date palms, and the trees in the garden are the same trees that were planted a hundred and fifty years ago, very strong, branched and beautiful trees. There is never an empty place of trees in every garden. The length of the garden is two hundred branches and its width is one hundred and fifty branches.

Mohammad Hossein Rokn-Zadeh Adamiat, an author and journalist of the Qajar and Pahlavi eras writes about this garden in the book Fars and International War:

Bagh Nazar is one of the old and lively gardens of Kazerun, which is famous for having old bitter orange trees in all of Fars and is a resort for people of taste and knowledge. In the year 1919, the author spent a night in that garden, and at dawn he was delighted by the fragrant scent of orange spring.

Hasan Fasa'i, an author and historian of the Qajar era writes about Nazar Garden in the book Fars-Nama-ye Naseri:

In the middle of the south and west of Kazerun, there is Nazar Garden, which was built by Haj Ali Qoli Khan and bitter orange trees were planted on its four streets, and the length of two of its streets is close to two hundred branches, and the other two streets are more than one hundred and thirty branches, and the bitter orange trees of Nazar Garden, It is the same one planted by Haj Ali Qali Khan and it is still full and strong.

General Sir Percy Sykes, an English officer and the founder of the South Persia Rifles in World War I, writes about Nazar Garden in the book Ten Thousand Miles in Iran:

One mile south of the city, we got off at the pleasant purely garden known as Nazar Garden. On the sides of the street of this garden, which is 200 meters long, Bitter oranges tree has been planted and has no equivalent anywhere.

Colonel Cherikov, the representative of the Russia government in Iran, who was the head of the Iran-Ottoman Boundary Commission at that time, writes in his travelogue:

Kazerun is a city with a very soulful and elegant and located in the middle of the mountain, it has green plains. There we saw a very beautiful garden, the trees of which were full of bitter oranges and lemons, and the intensity of flowers and rhododendrons was amazing.

Mohammad Taghi Mostafavi, an archeologist and head of the National Museum of Iran in the Pahlavi era mentions this garden in the book of Pars region:

Nazar Garden is outside the city and on the south side of the highway from Kazerun to Bushehr, which is famous for having tall, old and strong bitter orange trees.

Ali Naghi Behrouzi, an author and head of the Fars Culture Secretariat in the Pahlavi era writes about this garden:

In 1792, Haj Ali Qoli Khan Afshar Kazeruni dedicated Nazar Garden and other properties, including five plots of Land, four Farms, four Asiabs and six Qanats, and entrusted their management to Khajeh Reza Qoli Khan, the son of Khajeh Hassan Ali Afshar.

Mohammad Javad Behrouzi, a poet and writer of the Pahlavi era writes in the book Green city:

Nazar Garden is in the south of Kazerun and is one of the most important and beautiful gardens of Kazerun and Fars, which has been praised and described by foreigners and tourists. This garden was built in 1737 by Haj Ali Qoli Khan Afshar Kazeruni.

== Gallery ==
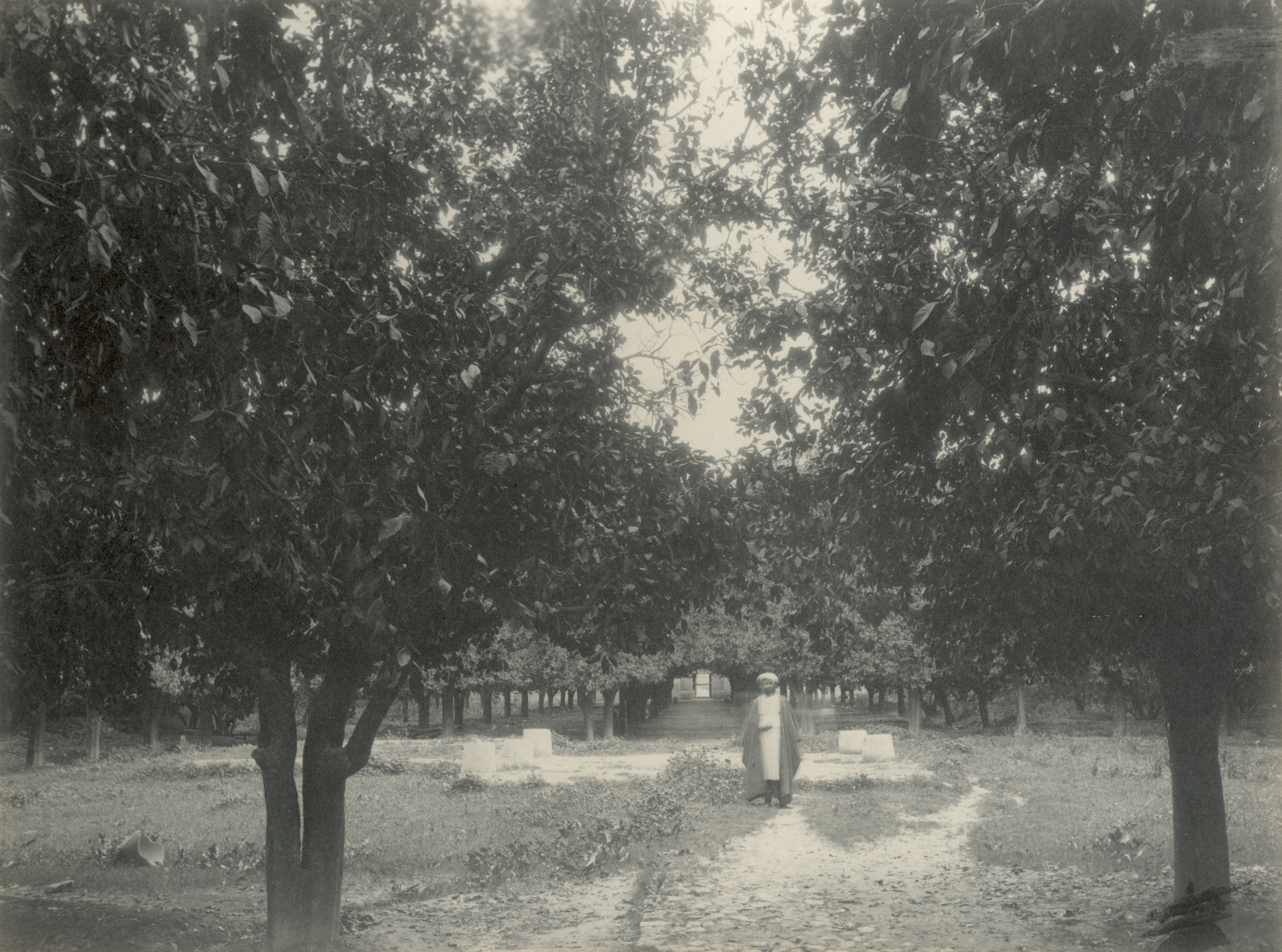
Nazar Garden in 1891, Author: Thomson, J.

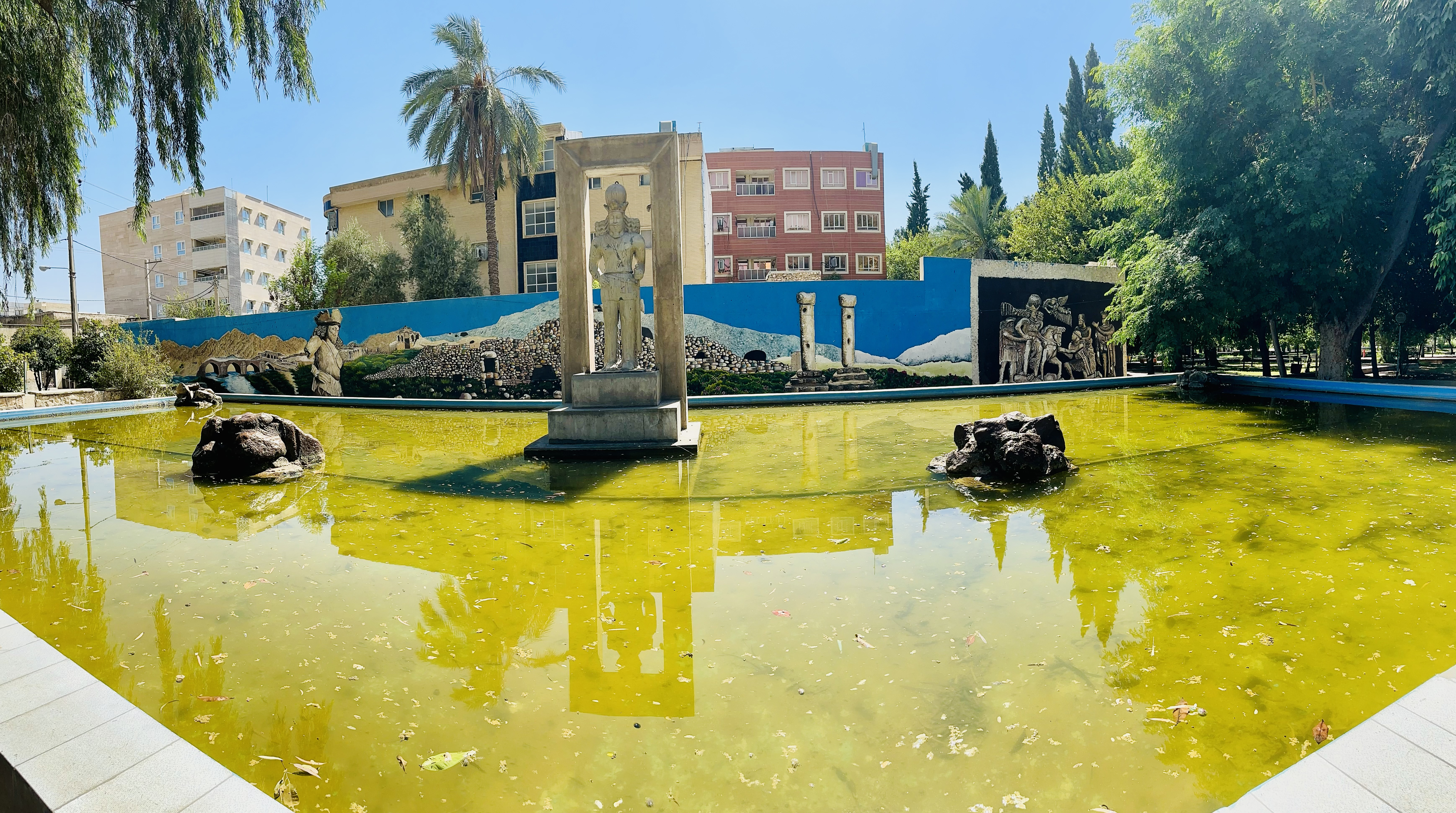
Statue of Shapur I, the Sasanian King in Nazar Garden

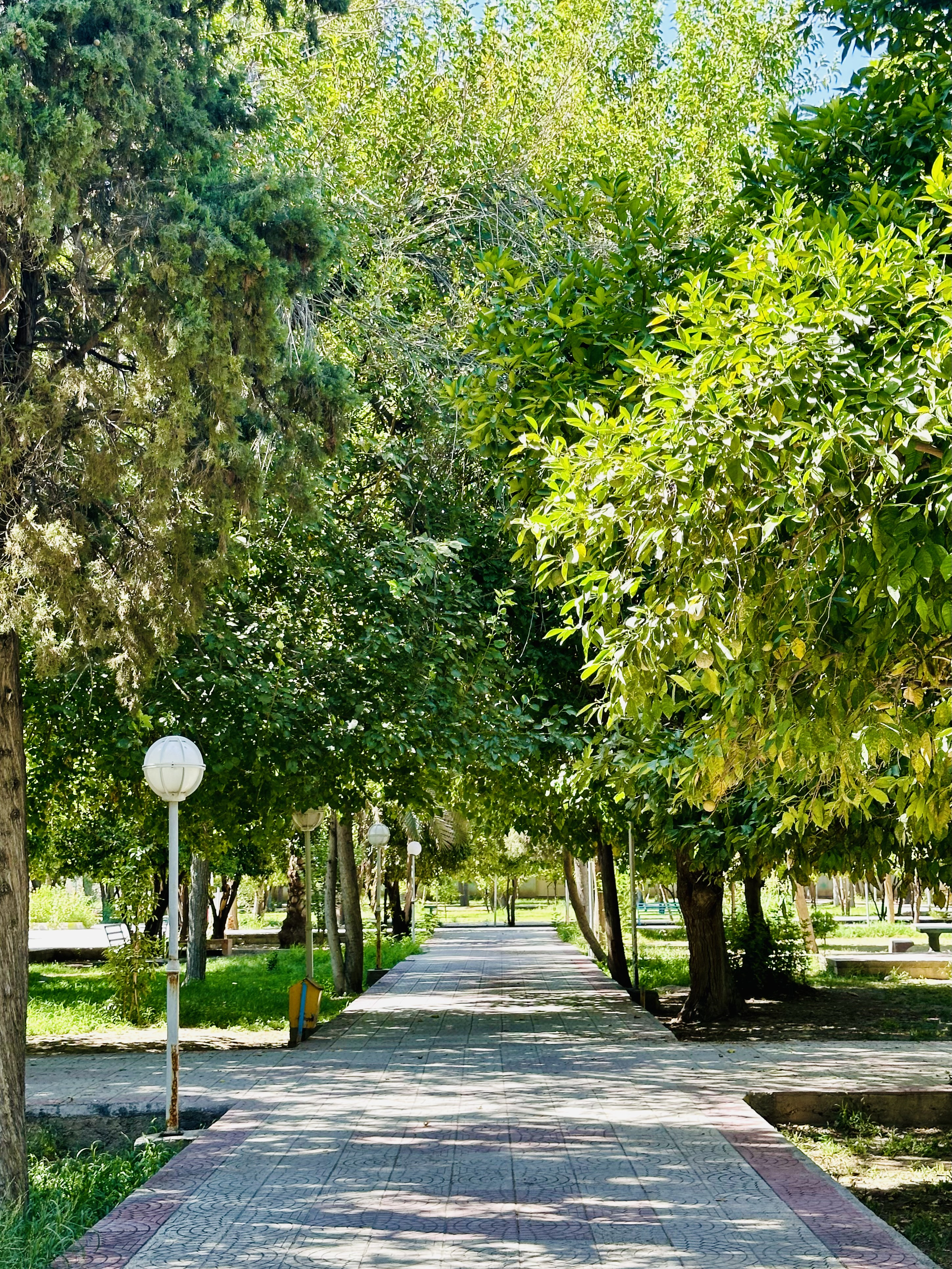

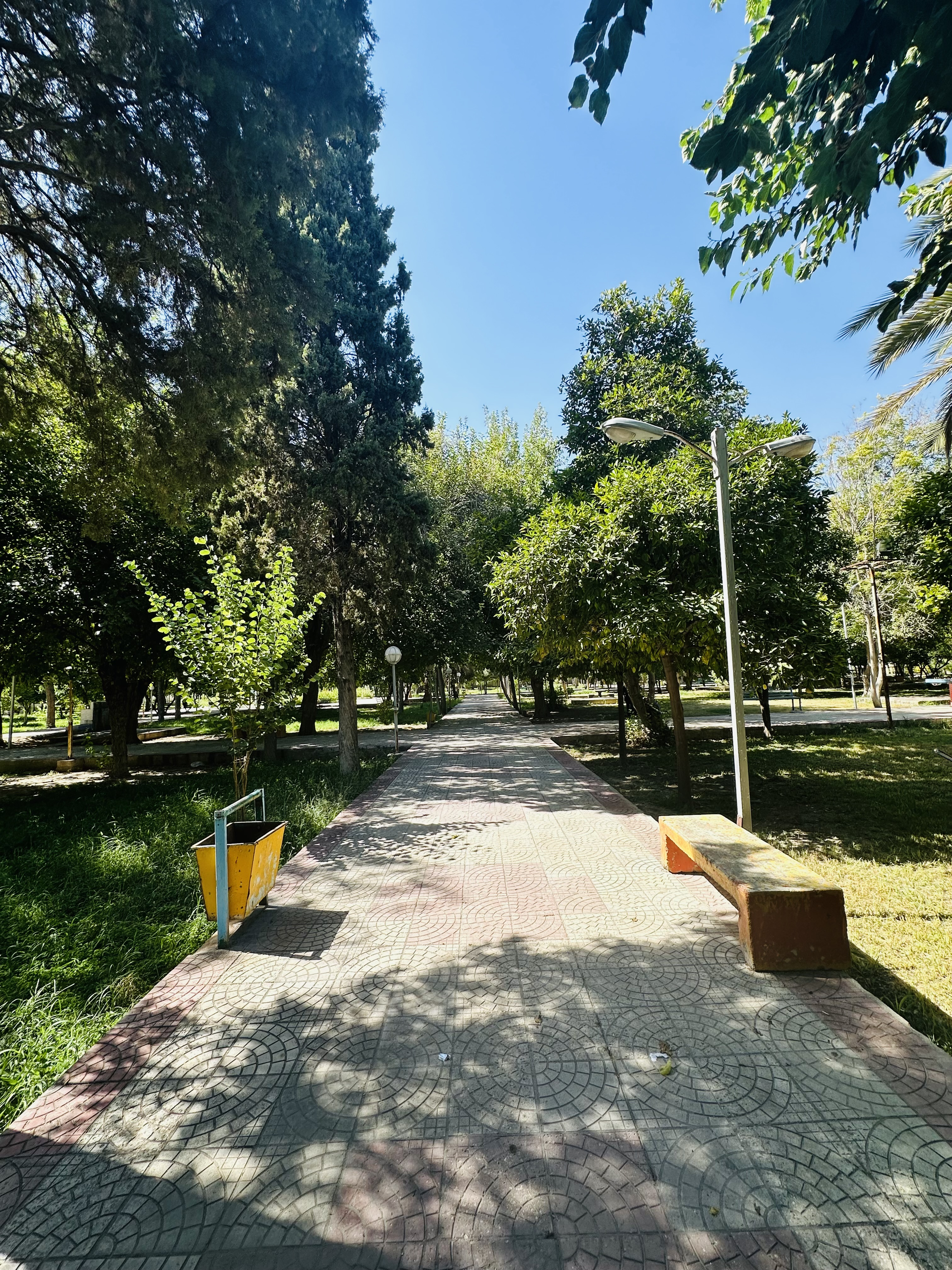

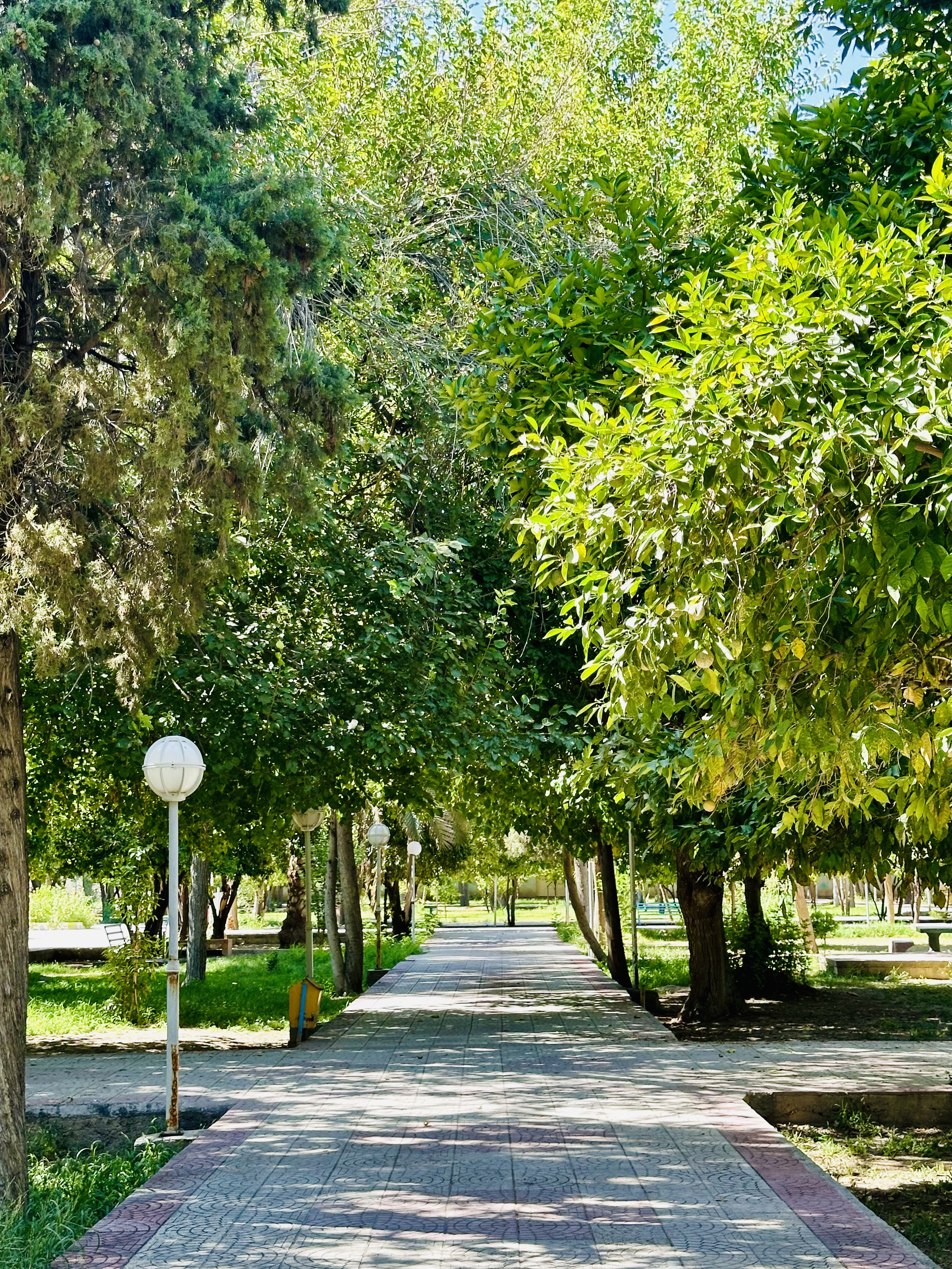

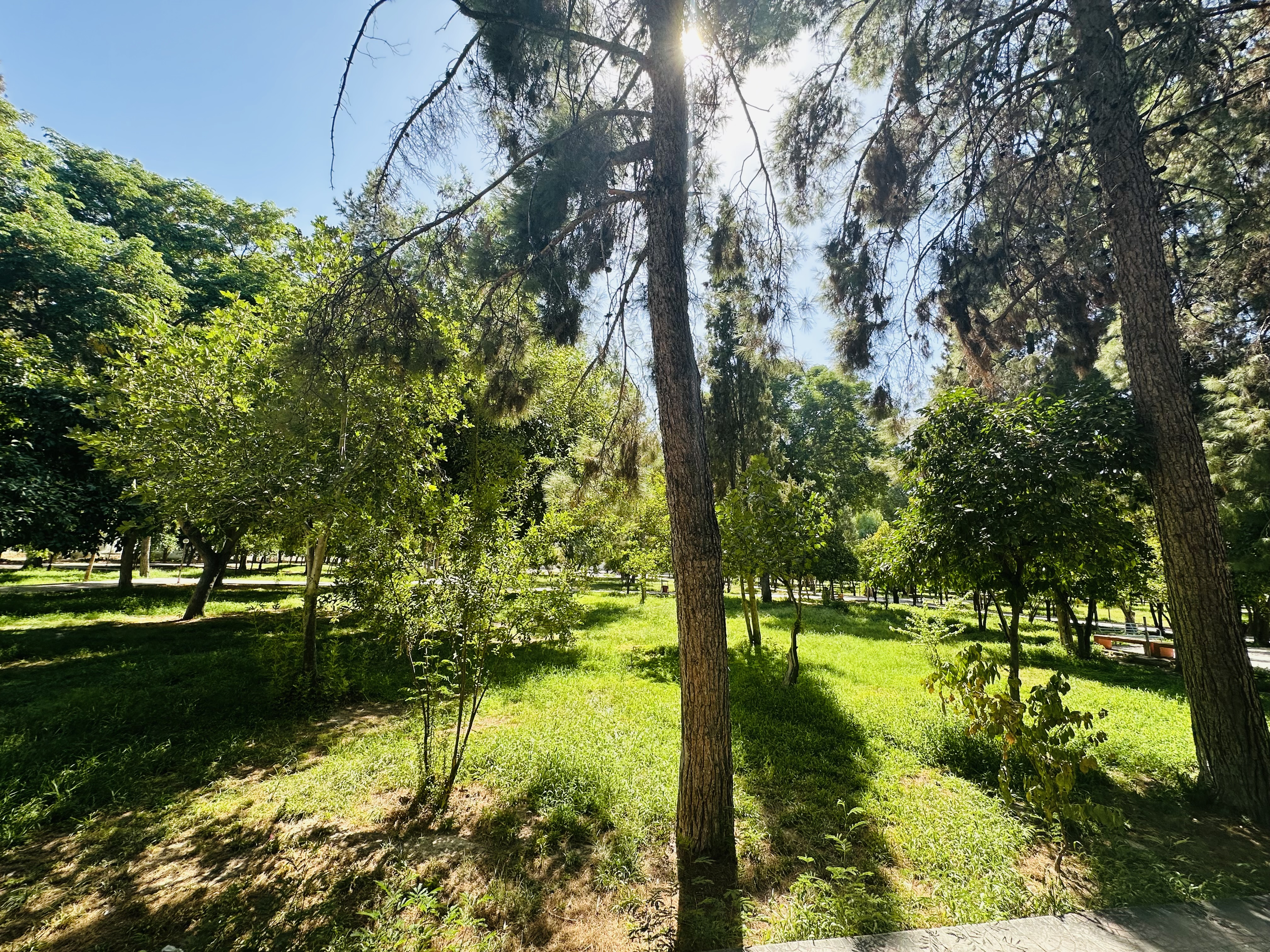

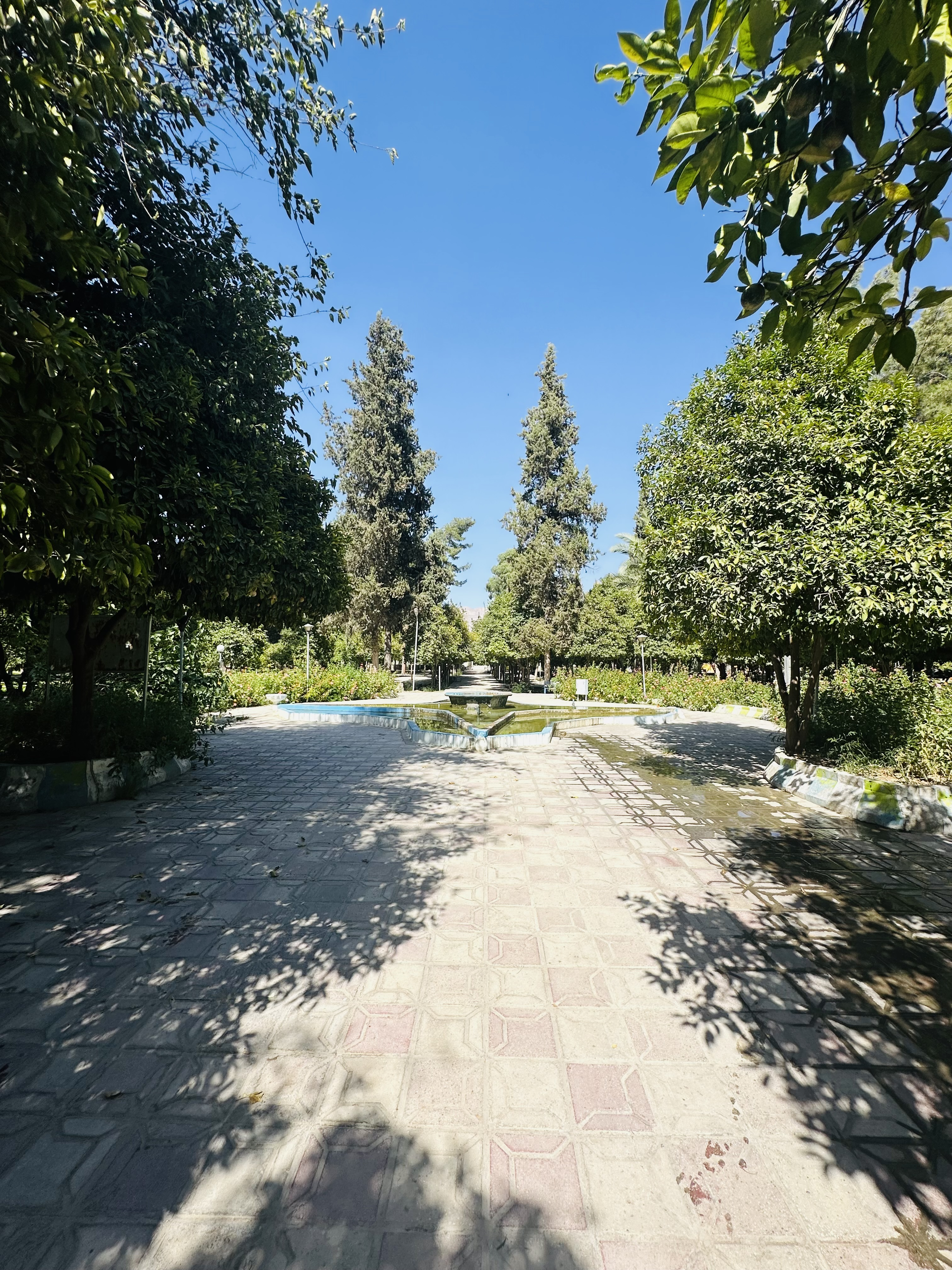

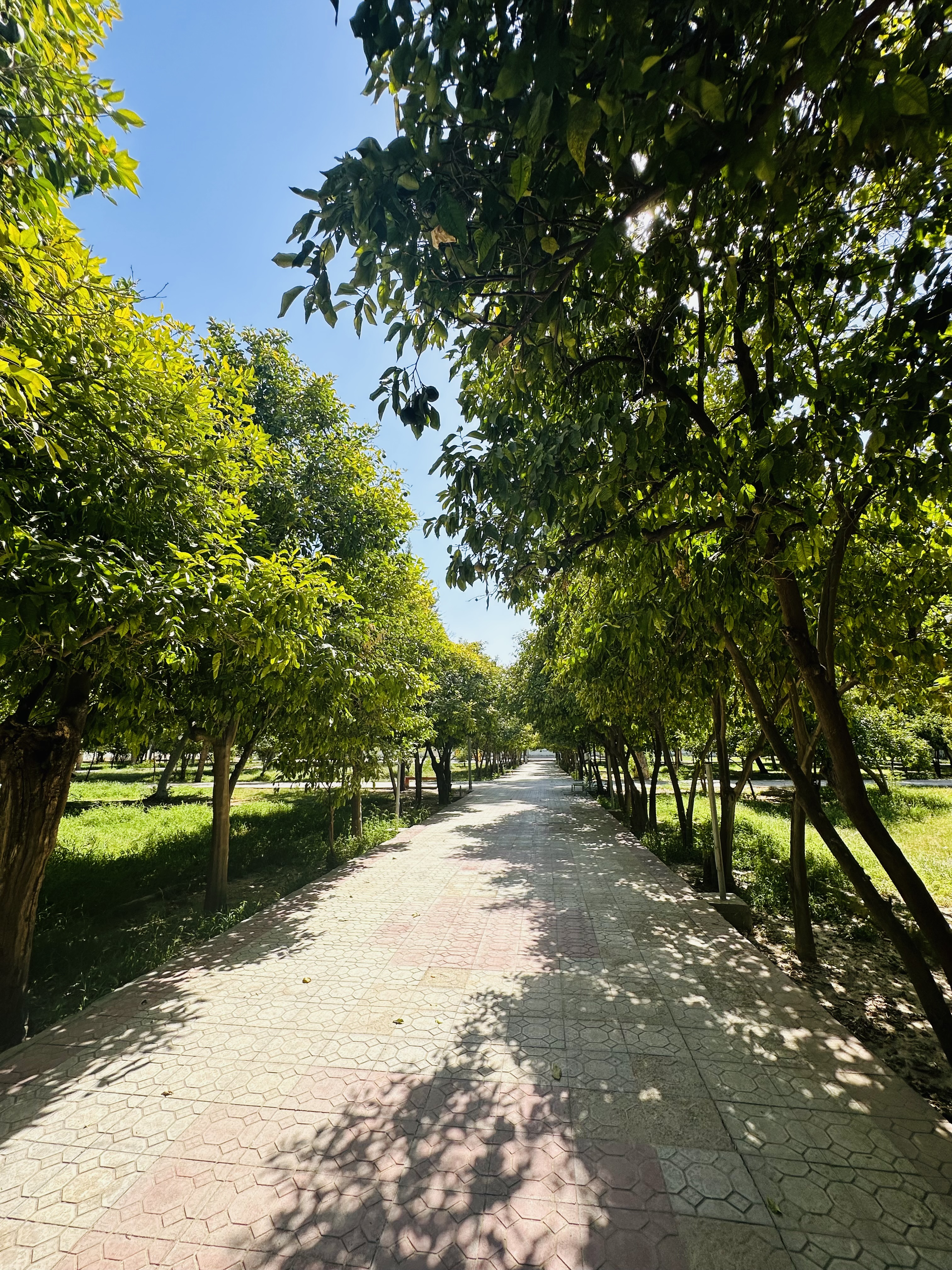

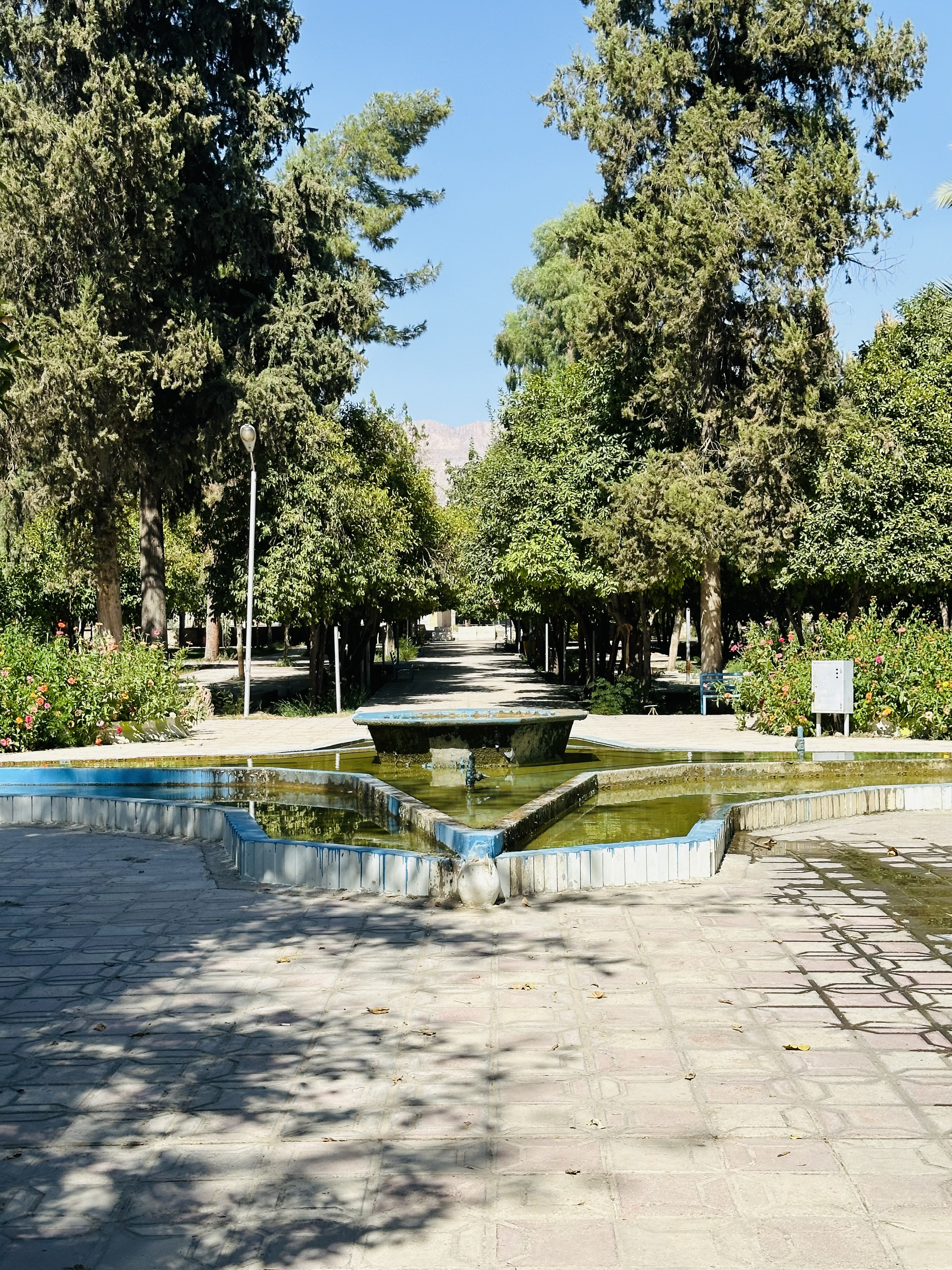

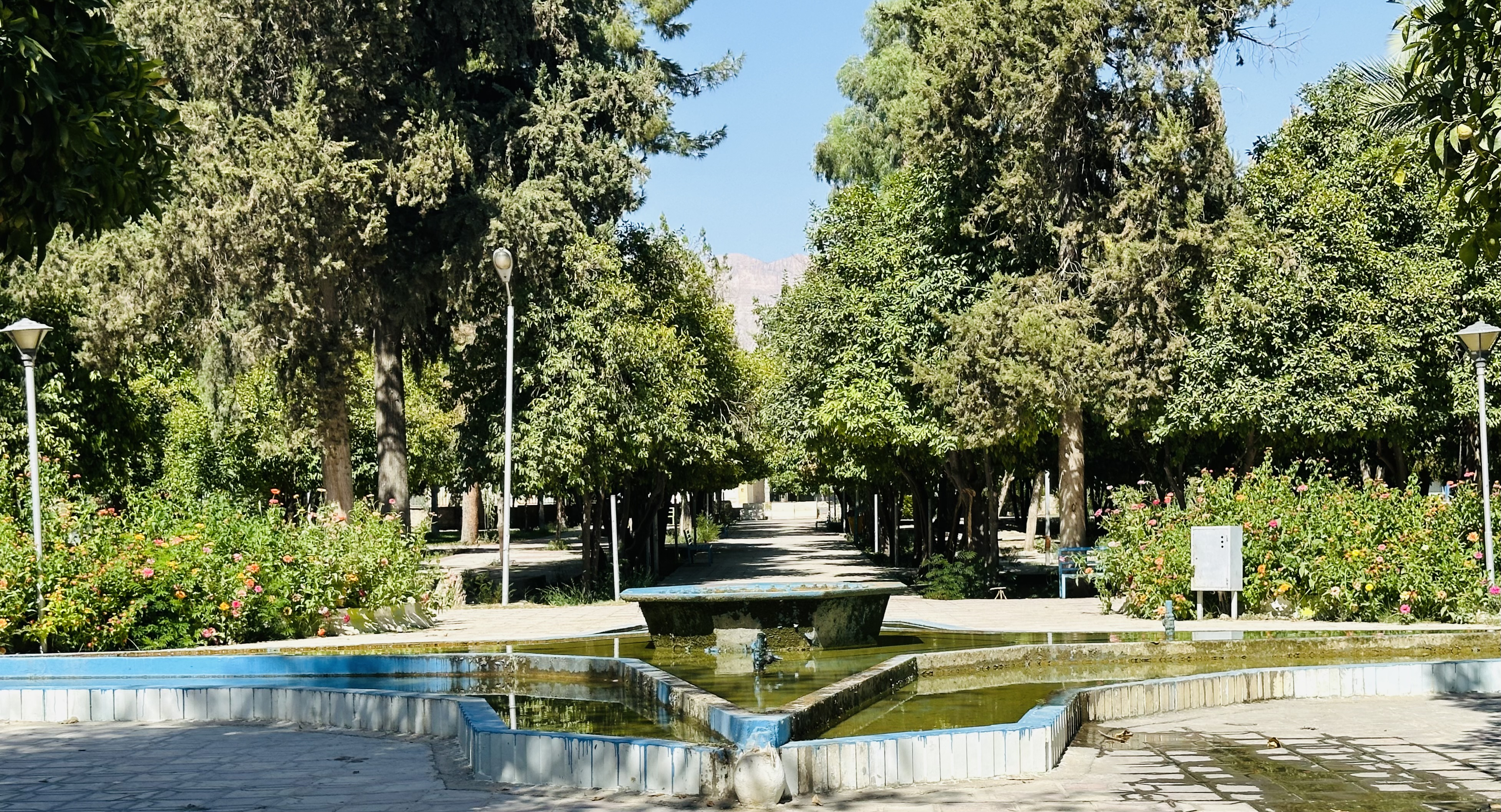

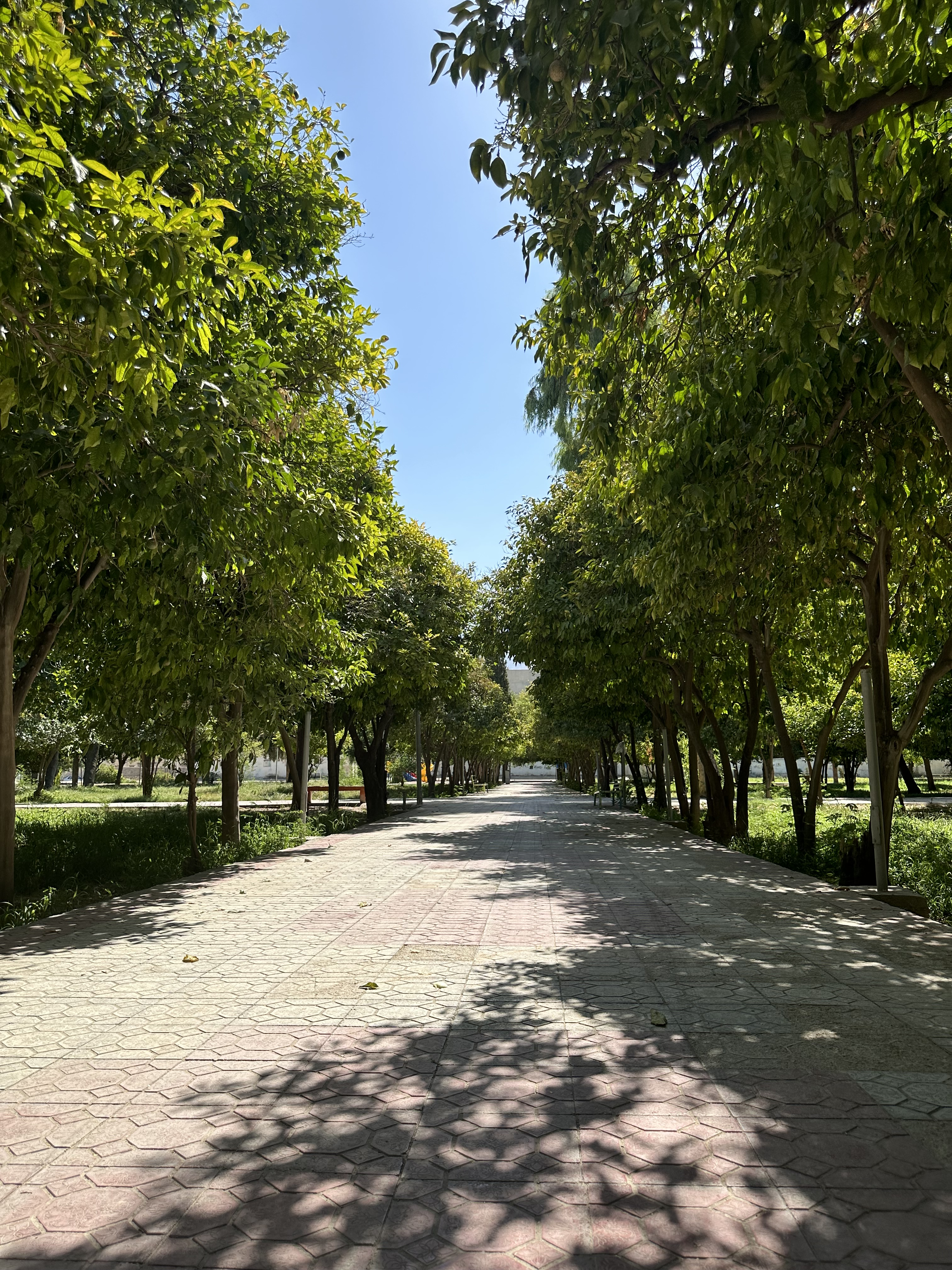

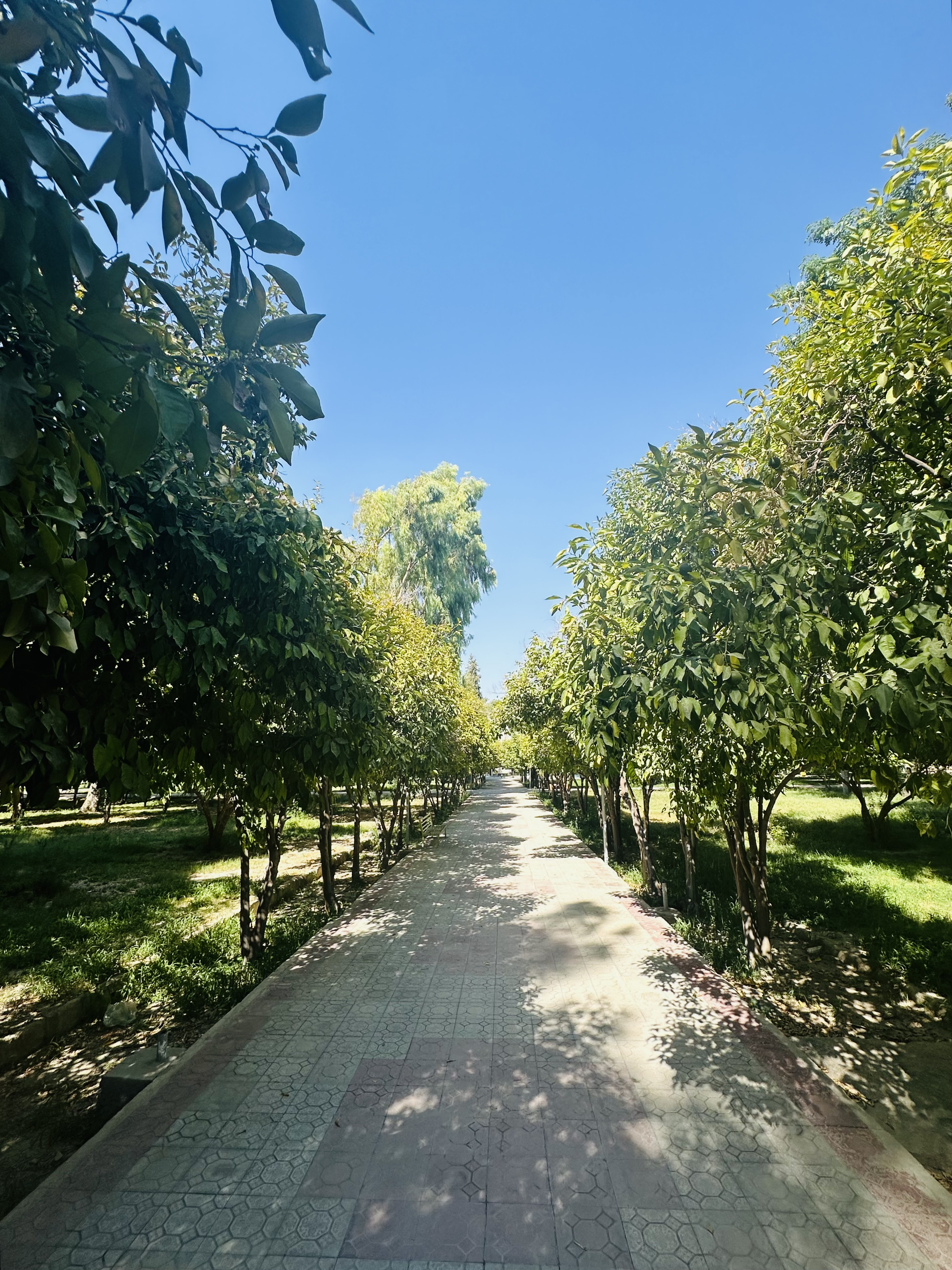

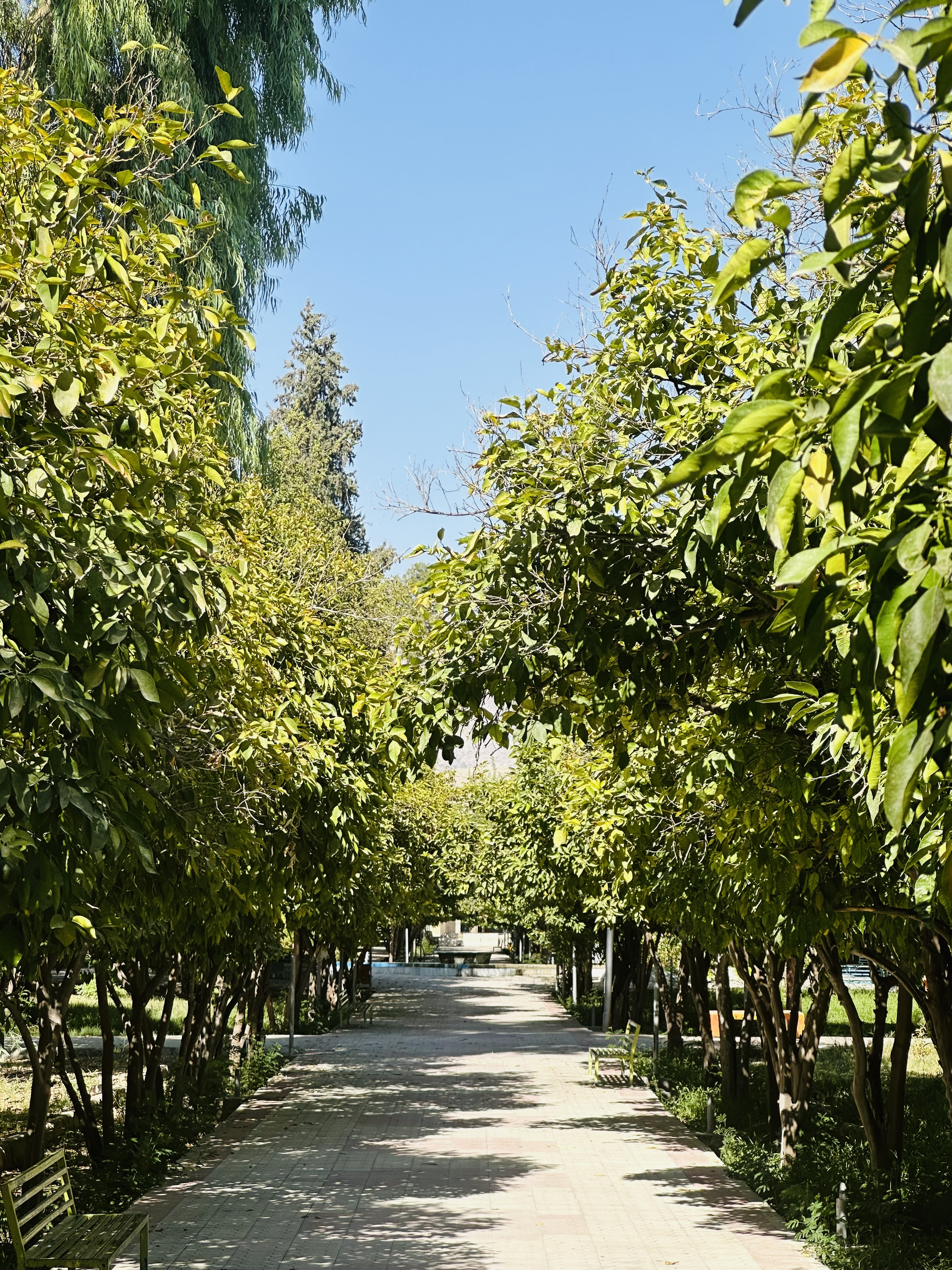

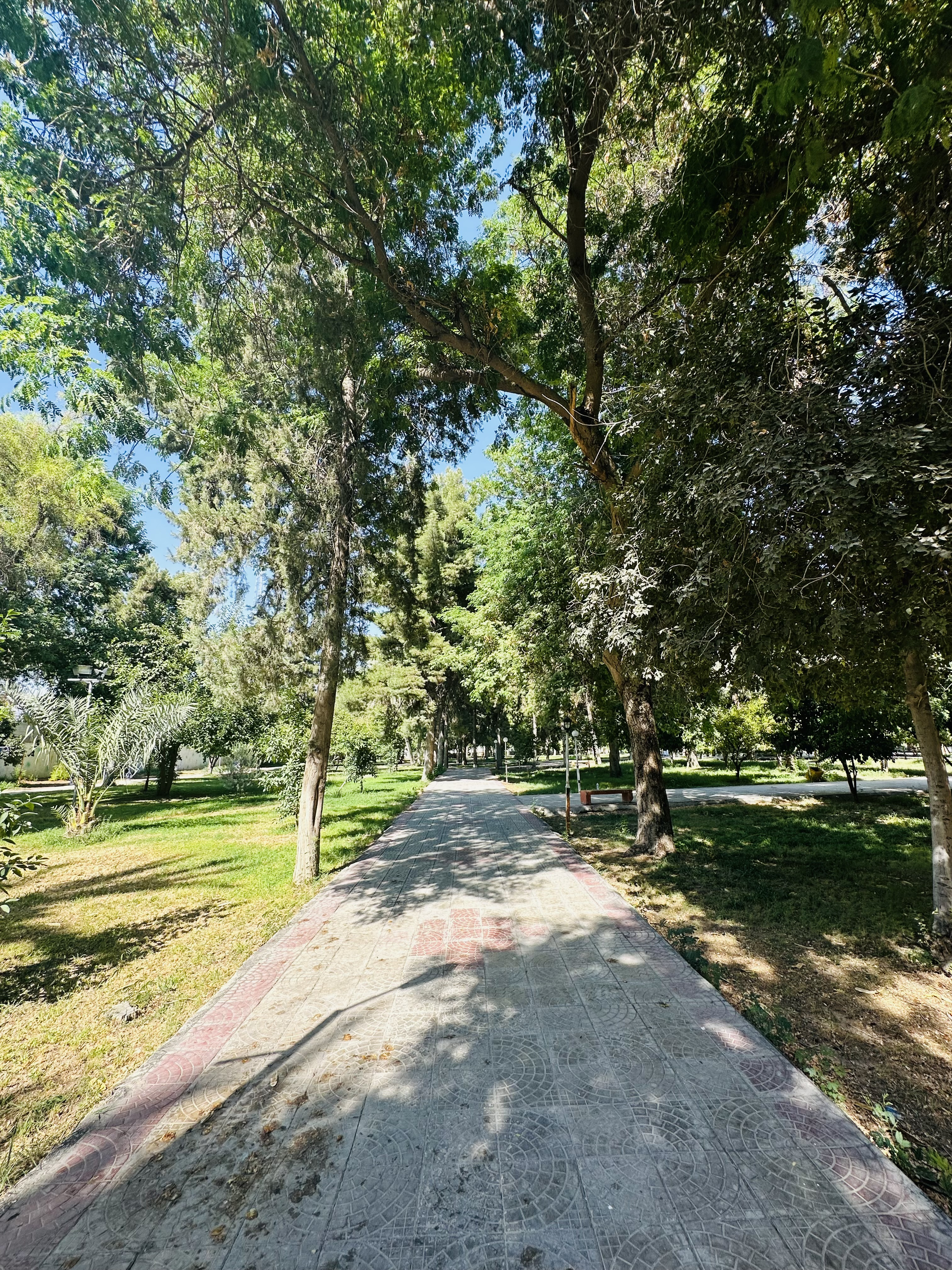

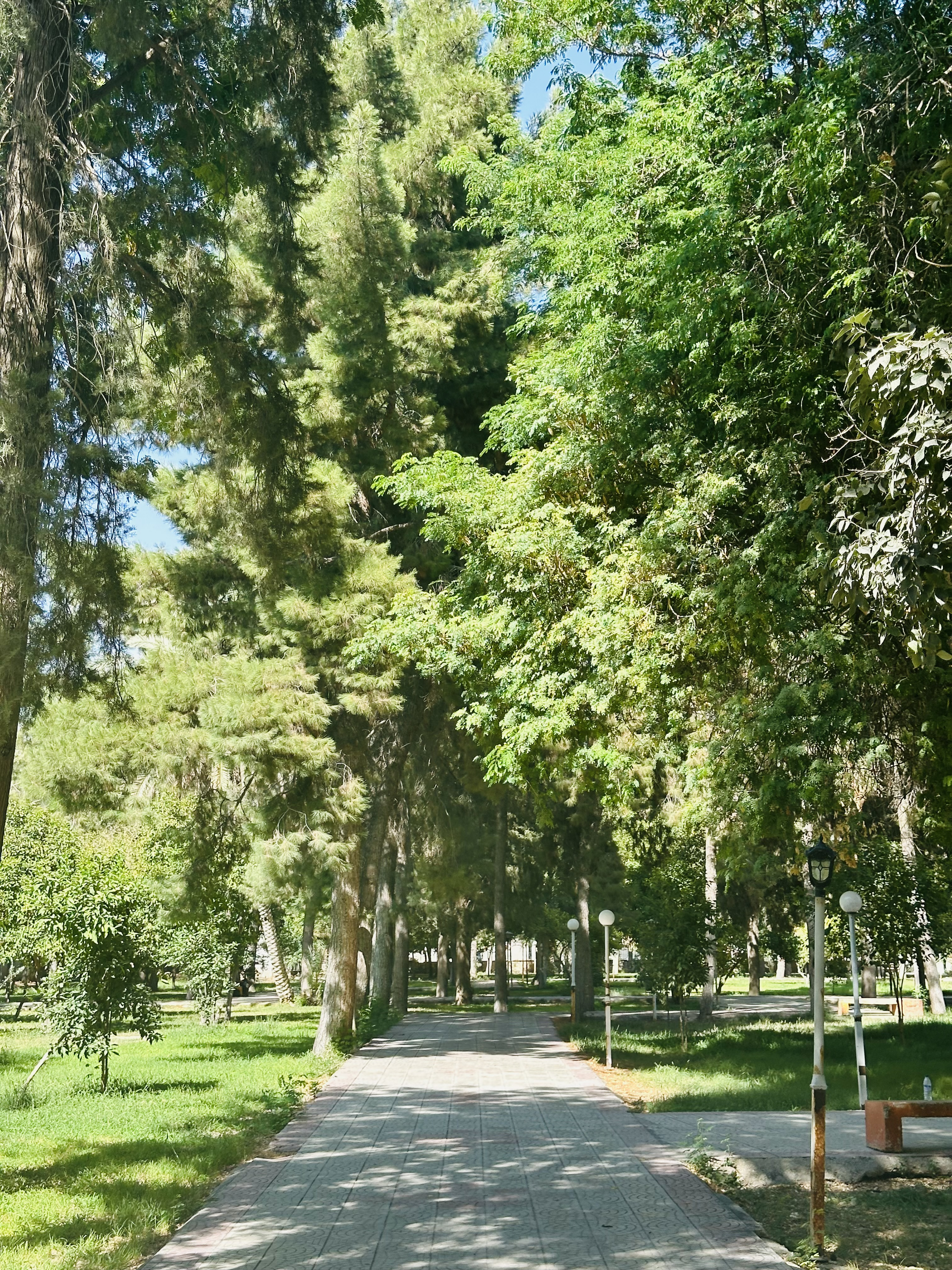

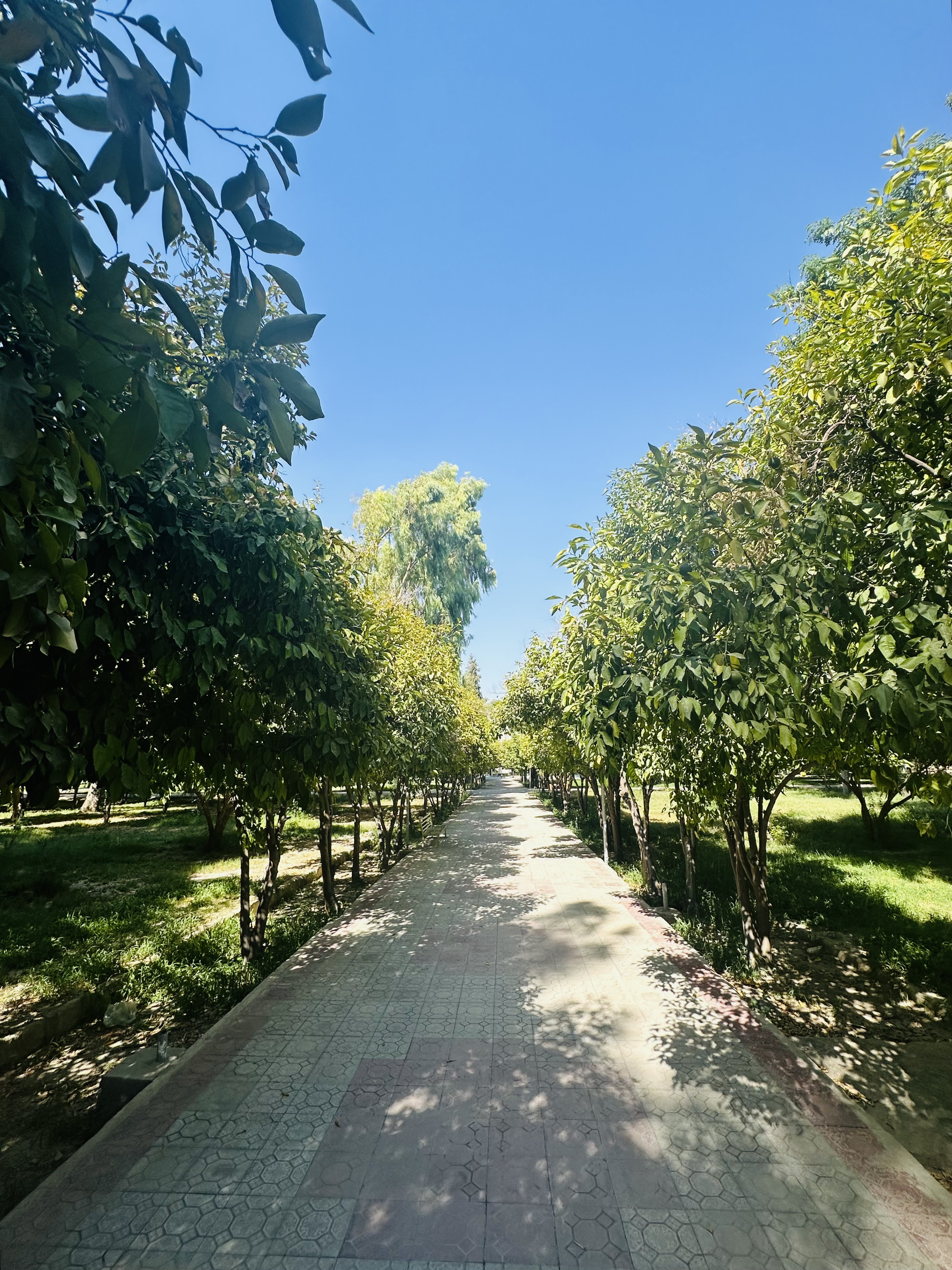

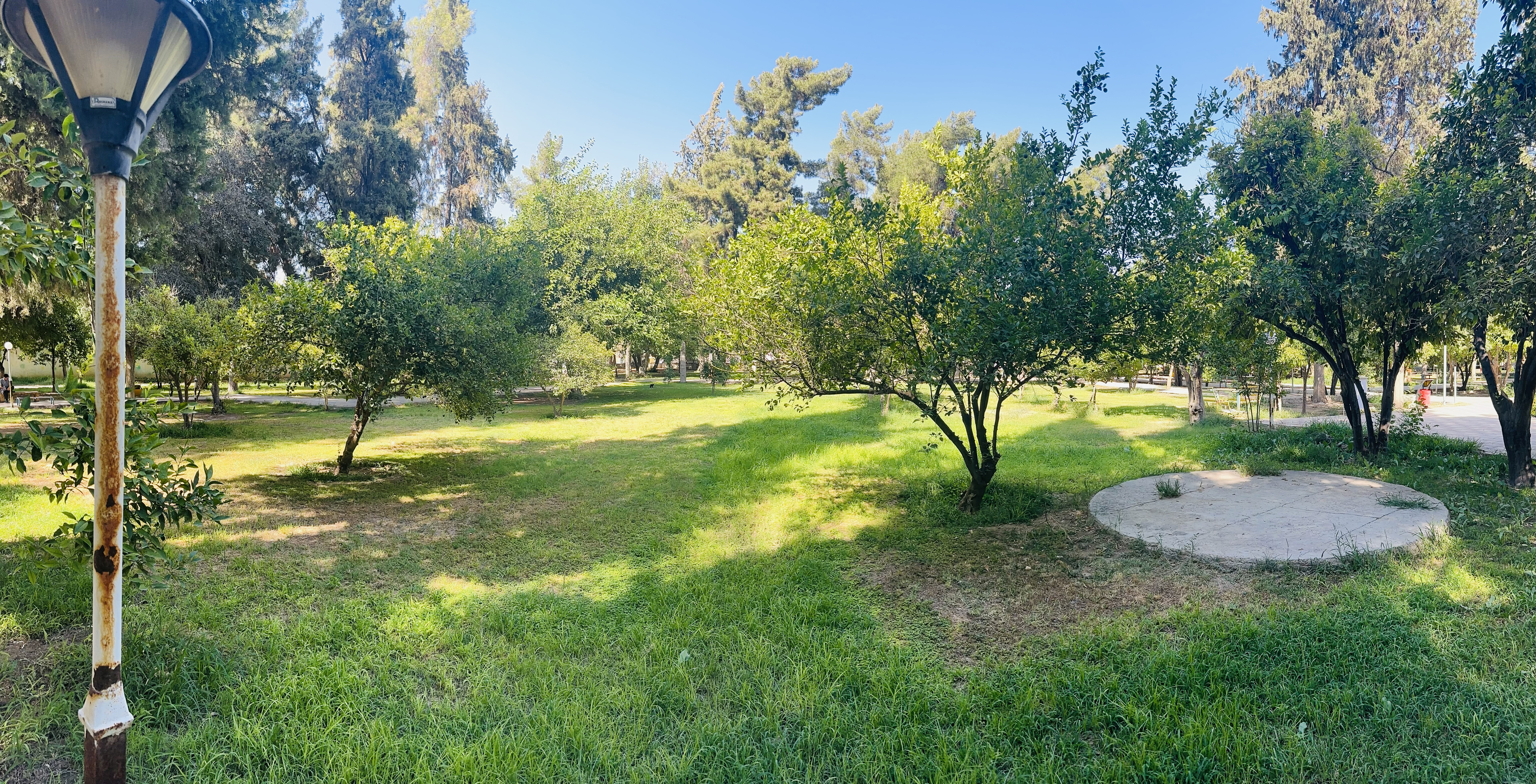

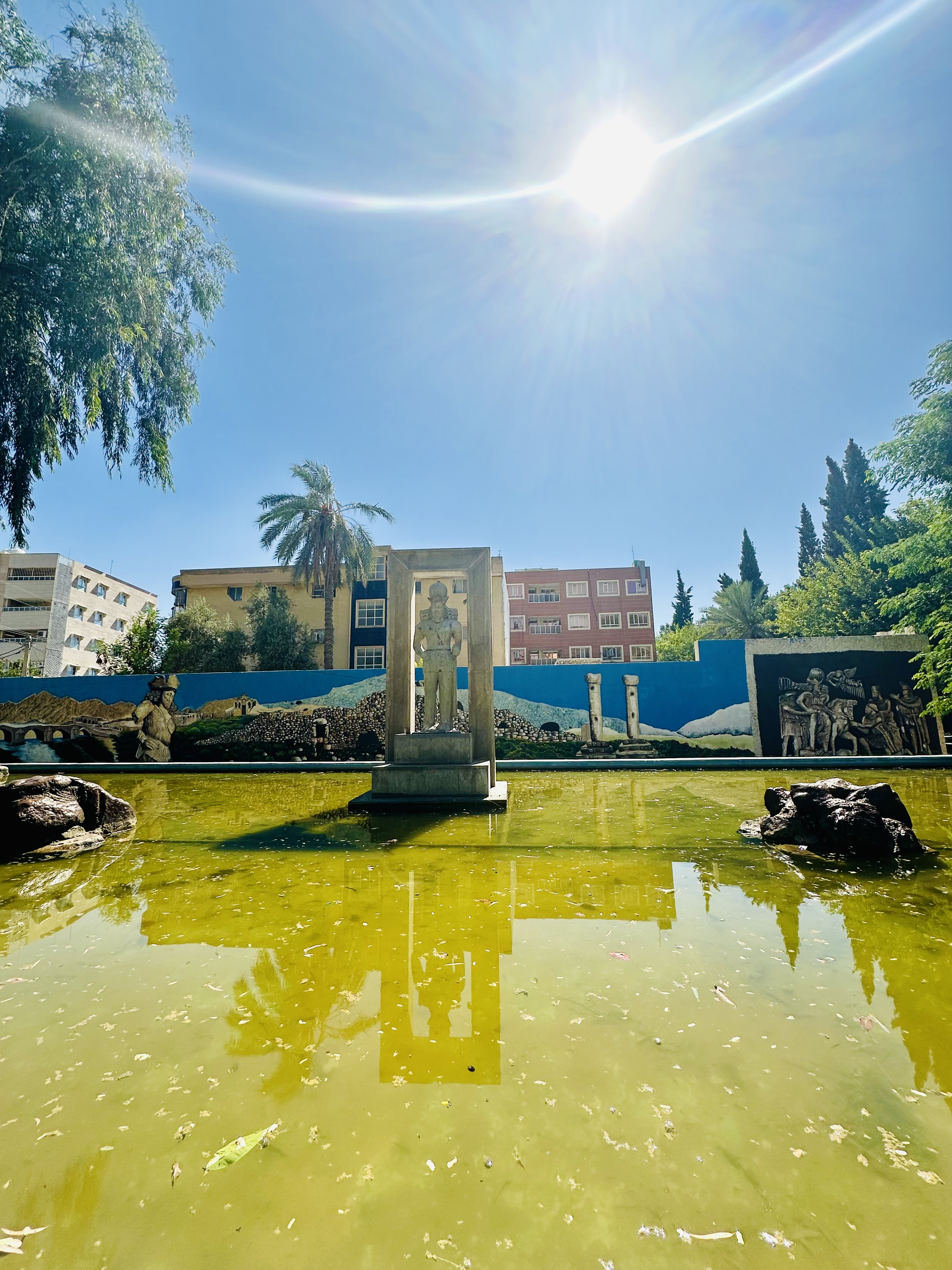
Statue of Shapur I, the Sasanian King in Nazar Garden

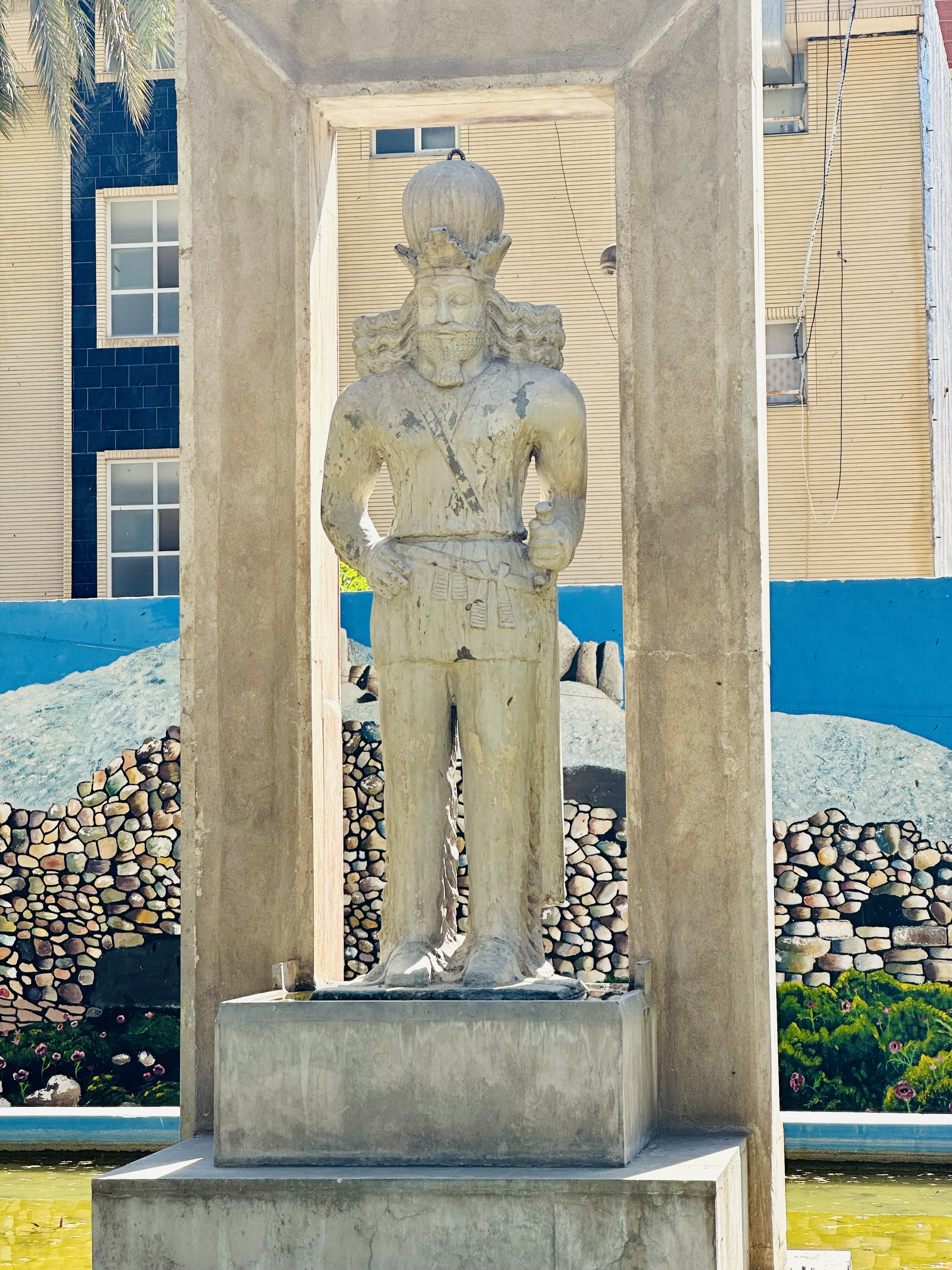
Statue of Shapur I, the Sasanian King in Nazar Garden

== Resources ==
- Nazar Garden (Persian Wikipedia)
- 1911 Encyclopædia Britannica/Kāzerūn
- Nazar Garden of Kazerun
- Nazar Garden
- Kazerun - IranTour
