= Golestan (newspaper) =

- Type: Newspaper
- Founder: Mohammadtaghi Golestan
- Founded: 1919
- Language: Persian
- City: Shiraz
- Country: Iran

Golestan (Persian: گلستان) is an Iranian newspaper in the Fars region. The Concessionaire of this newspaper was Mohammad taghi Golestan and it was published in Shiraz since 1919.

== See also ==
- List of magazines and newspapers of Fars
