= Zendegani =

Newspaper published in Fars Province

- Type: Newspaper
- Founder: Habibollah Noubakht
- Founded: 1918
- Language: Persian
- City: Shiraz
- Country: Iran

Estakhr (Persian: زندگانی) is an Iranian newspaper in the Fars region. The concessionaire of this newspaper was Habibollah Noubakht and it was published in Shiraz since 1918.

== See also ==
- List of magazines and newspapers of Fars
