= Hekayat-e Jangodaz-e Yazd ela Shiraz =

Hekayate jangodaze Yazd ela Shiraz
- Format: Magazine
- Founder: Fat'hollah Yazdi
- Founded: 1912
- Country: Iran
- Based in: Shiraz
- Language: Persian

Hekayate jangodaze vaghaye Yazd ela Shiraz (Persian: حکایت جانگداز وقایع یزد الی شیراز) is a Persian-language magazine in Fars province, Iran. The concessionaire of this magazine was Fathollah Yazdi (known as "Maftoon"), and it was published in the city of Shiraz since 1912.

== See also ==
- List of magazines and newspapers of Fars
