= Estakhr (newspaper) =

Iranian newspaper

- Type: Newspaper
- Founder: Mohammad hasan Bavanati
- Founded: 1918
- Language: Persian
- City: Shiraz
- Country: Iran

Estakhr (Persian: استخر) is an Iranian newspaper in the Fars region. The Concessionaire of this newspaper was Mohammadhasan Bavanati, known as Estakhr, and it has been published in Shiraz since 1918.

== See also ==
- List of magazines and newspapers of Fars
