= Ehya =

- Type: Newspaper
- Founder(s): Abdolhosein Zorriasatein
- Founded: 1911
- Language: Persian
- City: Shiraz
- Country: Iran

Ehya (Persian: احیا lit. "The Revival") is an Iranian newspaper in Fars province. The concessionaire of this magazine was Abdolhosein Zorriasatein and it was published in Shiraz since 1911.

== See also ==
- List of magazines and newspapers of Fars
