= Hafez Esteghlal =

Hafez e esteghlal
- Type: Newspaper
- Founder: Abolhasan Dehghan
- Founded: 1916
- Language: Persian
- City: Shiraz
- Country: Iran

Hafez-e-esteghlal (Persian: حافظ استقلال) is an Iranian newspaper in the Fars region. The Concessionaire of this newspaper was Abolhasan Dehghan and it has been published in Shiraz since 1916.

== See also ==
- List of magazines and newspapers of Fars
