= Tazianeh Qeirat =

- Type: Newspaper
- Founder: Manko Gha'an Zolkheir
- Founded: 1915; 111 years ago
- Language: Persian
- City: Shiraz
- Country: Iran

Tazianeh Qeirat (Persian: تازیانه غیرت) is an Iranian newspaper in Fars province. The concessionaire of this newspaper was Mankou Ghaane Zolkheir and it was published in Shiraz since 1915.

== See also ==
- List of magazines and newspapers of Fars
