= Ciaci =

Iranian newspaper

Siasi
- Type: Newspaper
- Founder: Mohammadhasan Saes
- Founded: 1910
- Language: Persian
- City: Shiraz
- Country: Iran

Siasi or Ciaci (Persian: سیاسی) is an Iranian newspaper in Fars province. The concessionaire of this magazine was Mohammadhasan Saes (known as Shahidzadeh) and it was first published in Shiraz in the year 1910.

== See also ==
- List of magazines and newspapers of Fars
