= Ayineh =

Iranian newspaper

- Type: Newspaper
- Founder(s): Morteza Shojaossadat
- Founded: 1910
- Language: Persian
- City: Shiraz
- Country: Iran

Ayineh (Persian: آیینه lit. "The Mirror") is an Iranian newspaper in the Fars region. The Concessionaire of this newspaper was Morteza Shojaossadat and it was published in Shiraz since 1910.

== See also ==
- List of magazines and newspapers of Fars
