= Entegham =

- Type: Newspaper
- Founder: Mohammadhasan Naseroleslam
- Founded: 1916
- Language: Persian
- City: Shiraz
- Country: Iran

Entegham (Persian: انتقام) is an Iranian newspaper in Fars province. The Concessionaire of this newspaper was Mohammadhasan Naserol'eslam and it was published in Shiraz since 1916.

== See also ==
- List of magazines and newspapers of Fars
