= Fekr-e Azad =

Iranian newspaper

- Type: Newspaper
- Founder: Habibollah Noubakht
- Founded: 1919
- Language: Persian
- City: Shiraz
- Country: Iran

Fekr-e Azad (Persian: فکر آزاد) is an Iranian newspaper published in the Fars region, Shiraz. The Concessionaire of the newspaper was Habibollah Noubakht and it was published since 1919.

== See also ==
- List of magazines and newspapers of Fars
