= Toloo =

- Type: Newspaper
- Founder: Abdolhamidkhan Matinossaltaneh
- Founded: 1900
- Language: Persian
- City: Bushire
- Country: Iran

Toloo or Tolou (Persian: طلوع) is an Iranian newspaper in Fars province. The concessionaire of this magazine was Abdolhamid Khan Matinossaltaneh, and it was published in the city of Bushire since 1900.

== See also ==
- List of magazines and newspapers of Fars
