= Hayat (newspaper) =

- Type: Newspaper
- Founder: Mohammad Hosein Shariat
- Founded: 1910
- Language: Persian
- City: Shiraz
- Country: Iran

Hayat (Persian: حیات) is an Iranian newspaper in Fars province. The concessionaire of this magazine was Mohammad Hosein Shari'at and it was published in Shiraz since 1910.

== See also ==
- List of magazines and newspapers of Fars
