= Darolelm =

- Type: Newspaper
- Founder: Enayatollah Dastgheib
- Founded: 1909
- Language: Persian
- City: Shiraz
- Country: Iran

Darolelm (Persian: دارالعلم) is an Iranian newspaper in Fars province. The concessionaire of this magazine was Enayatollah Dastgheib and it was published in Shiraz since 1909.

== See also ==
- List of magazines and newspapers of Fars
