= Donyaye Iran =

Persian daily newspaper

Donyâye Irân
- Type: Newspaper
- Founder: Habibollah Noubakht
- Founded: 1920
- Language: Persian
- City: Shiraz
- Country: Iran

Donyâye Irân (Persian: دنیای ایران, lit. 'The World of Iran') is an Iranian newspaper in the Fars region. The concessionaire of this newspaper was Habibollah Noubakht and it was published in Shiraz since 1920.

== See also ==
- List of magazines and newspapers of Fars
