= The Fars =

- Type: Newspaper
- Founder(s): Forsat Shirazi, Fazlollah Banan
- Founded: 1913
- Language: Persian
- City: Shiraz
- Country: Iran

The Fars (Persian: فارس) is an Iranian newspaper in Fars province. The concessionaires of this magazine were Forsat-od-Dowleh Shirazi and Fazlollah Banan and it was published in Shiraz since 1913.

== See also ==
- List of magazines and newspapers of Fars
