= Fars (newspaper) =

Al-Montabaaho-fil-Fars
- Type: Newspaper
- Founder(s): Mirza Taghikhan Kashani
- Founded: 1872
- Language: Persian
- City: Shiraz
- Country: Iran

Fars or Al-Montabaato fi-l-Fars (Persian: المنطبعه فی الفارس) is an Iranian newspaper in Fars region. The concessionaire of this magazine was Mirza Taghi-Khan Kashani and it was published in Shiraz since 1872. This was the first modern newspaper which was published in southern Iran.

== See also ==
- List of magazines and newspapers of Fars
