= Okhovvat =

Iranian newspaper

Okhovvat-e-Shiraz
- Type: Newspaper
- Founder(s): Abdolkarim Maaroofli
- Founded: 1908
- Language: Persian
- City: Shiraz
- Country: Iran

Okhovvat e Shiraz (Persian: اخوت شیراز) is an Iranian newspaper in Fars province. The concessionaire of this magazine was Abdolkarim Maaroofli and it was published in Shiraz since 1908.

== See also ==
- List of magazines and newspapers of Fars
