= Nahid (newspaper) =

Iranian newspaper (1921–1933)

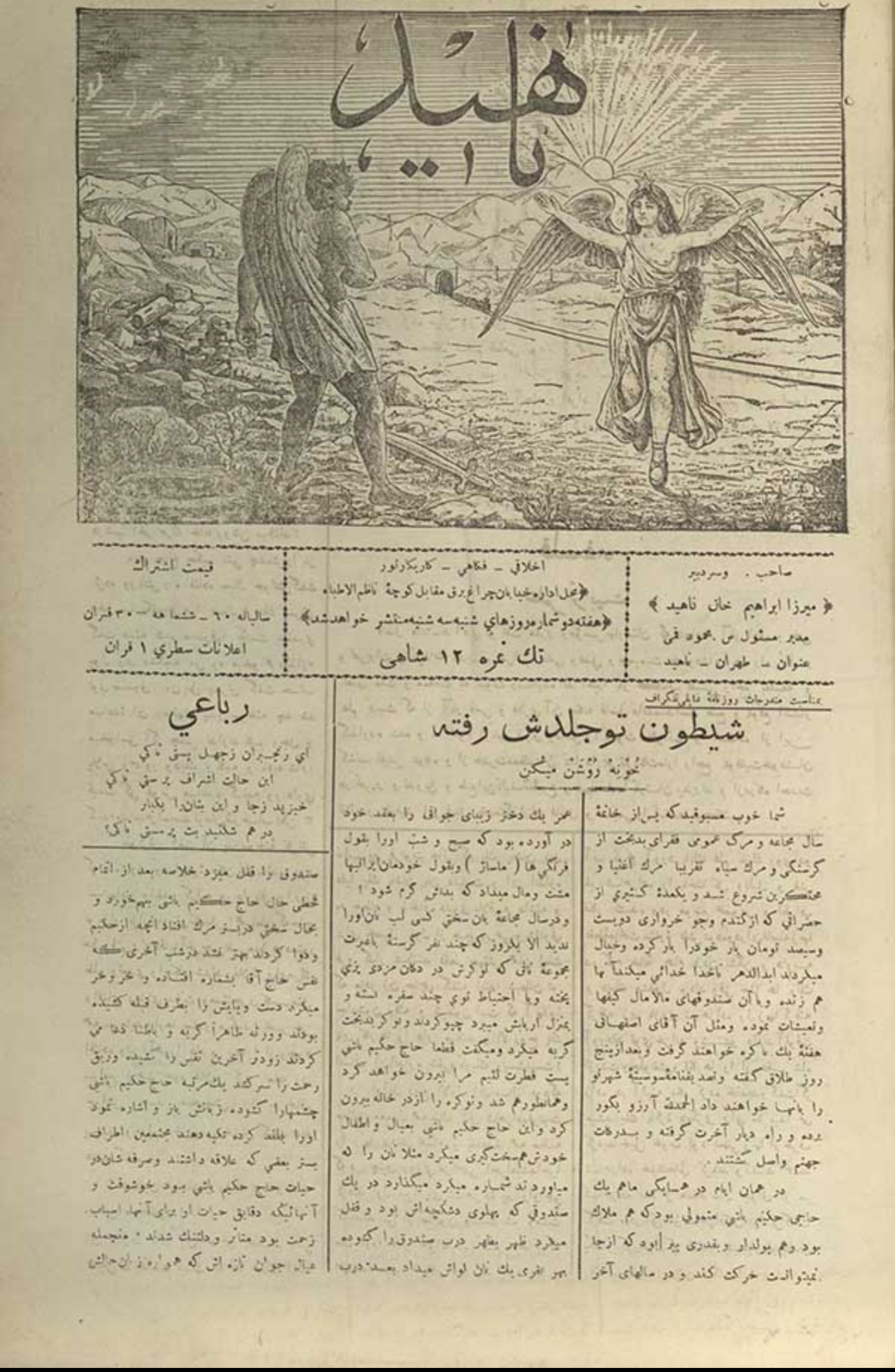
- Front page cover of a Nahid newspaper issue.
- Type: Newspaper
- Founder: Mirza Ebrahim Nahid
- Founded: 11 April 1921
- Language: Persian
- Headquarters: Lālehzār Street, Tehran, Iran
- City: Tehran
- Country: Iran

Nahid (Persian: ناهید) was a weekly satirical and political newspaper published in Tehran, Iran, between 1921 and 1933. Founded and edited by Mirza Ebrahim Nahid, the paper became one of the best-known humor and commentary publications of the early Pahlavi era.

== History ==
Nahid was first printed in Shiraz in the late Qajar era and soon relocated to Tehran, where its first issue appeared on 22 Farvardin 1300 SH (11 April 1921). The paper quickly gained attention for its blend of satire, political commentary, and colloquial humor.

Its editor, Mirza Ebrahim Nahid, used the publication to comment on social reform and political developments. The newspaper initially expressed support for Reza Khan (later Reza Shah Pahlavi) during his early rise to power.

One of its most notable contributors was the poet and musician Aref Qazvini, who published patriotic and satirical poems in support of the paper’s reformist stance.

Nahid faced repeated censorship and brief suspensions under government pressure. Its headquarters were located on Lālehzār Street in central Tehran, a hub for print and cultural activity in the 1920s.

The publication continued until 20 Ordībehesht 1312 SH (10 May 1933), when the newspaper's office was destroyed by a fire, leading to its closure.

== Style and content ==
Nahid combined humor, colloquial Persian, and satire to criticize hypocrisy, bureaucracy, and social corruption. According to Radio Zamaneh, it played a significant role in shaping the tradition of satirical journalism in Iran.

The paper’s recurring features included:

- Short humorous essays on urban life in Tehran
- Political satire aimed at court politics and religious conservatism
- Poems and songs contributed by reformist writers such as Aref Qazvini

== Legacy ==
Nahid is recognized as one of Iran’s most important early satirical newspapers, bridging the Qajar and early Pahlavi eras. It helped shape the tone of political humor that would later influence publications such as Tawfiq.

The University of Chicago Library’s Popular Press of the Middle East catalogue lists Nahid among Iran’s major publications of the period, identifying Mirza Ebrahim Nahid as its editor.

== See also ==
- Mirza Ebrahim Nahid
- Aref Qazvini
- Iranian satire
- Press in Iran
- Reza Shah Pahlavi
- List of magazines and newspapers of Fars
