= Nedaye eslam =

Nedaye Eslam
- Type: Newspaper
- Founder(s): Zia'eddin Tabatabaee
- Founded: 1907
- Language: Persian
- City: Shiraz
- Country: Iran

Nedaye eslam (Persian: ندای اسلام) is an Iranian newspaper in Fars province. The concessionaire of this magazine was Zia'eddin Tabatabaee and it was published in Shiraz since 1907.

== See also ==
- List of magazines and newspapers of Fars
- List of newspapers in Iran
