= Mozaffari (newspaper) =

Newspaper in Fars, Iran

- Type: Newspaper
- Founder: Mirza Aliagha Shirazi
- Founded: 1901
- Language: Persian
- City: Bushire
- Country: Iran

Mozaffari (Persian: مظفری) is a Persian newspaper in Fars province. The concessionaire of this magazine publisher was Mirza Aliagha Shirazi and it was published in Bushire since 1901.

== See also ==
- List of magazines and newspapers of Fars
- List of newspapers in Iran
