= Afash =

Afash is a surname. Notable people with the surname include:

- Fadi Afash (born 1974), Syrian footballer
- Mohammad Afash (born 1966), Syrian footballer

== See also ==
- Afagh
