= Behrouz Afagh =

British journalist

Behrouz Afagh (Persian: بهروز آفاق) is Head of BBC World Service's Asia & Pacific Region. He was born and brought up in Iran and studied at Tehran University and then at the University of Surrey in Britain. He has lived in Britain since 1978.

== Career ==
He is editorially and managerially responsible for the BBC's broadcasts and multimedia services in the Azeri, Bengali, Burmese, Chinese, Hindi, Indonesian, Kyrgyz, Nepali, Pashto, Persian, Sinhala, Tamil, Urdu and Uzbek languages. He is responsible for the launch of a BBC Persian television service for Iran which will be launched in 2008.

Afagh joined BBC World Service in 1983. He worked as a producer and then editor in the Persian Service and as an editor in the Vietnamese Service. He set up the BBC Central Asian Service in 1994 and became Editor of Eurasia Region in 1999. He was Head of the Eurasia Region from March 2003. He became Head of the Asia Pacific Region in April 2006.
