= Afagh (newspaper) =

Iranian newspaper

- Type: Newspaper
- Founder: Seyed Javad Bavanati
- Founded: 1909
- Language: Persian
- City: Shiraz
- Country: Iran

Afagh (Persian: آفاق) is an Iranian newspaper in the Fars region. The concessionaire of this newspaper was Seyed Javad Bavanati and it was published in Shiraz since 1909.

== See also ==
- List of magazines and newspapers of Fars
