= Asar-e Ajam =

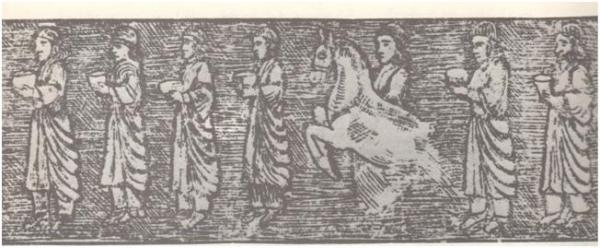
A detail of Forst's drawing of Qasre Abunasr from Asar-e Ajam

Āsār-e Ajam (Note: Also transliterated as Ātār-e Ajam, Āthār-e Ajam, and Asar-i Ajam) (Persian: آثار عجم, pronounced [ɒːsɒːr-e ædʒæm], lit. "Antiquities of the Persians") is a travelogue and historical book written by Forsat Shirazi between 1881 and 1895 which mostly contains first-hand biographical information about the elite of Fārs, sources on the history of the region as well as its geography. It also involves a collection of more than fifty drawings of various historical sites of Persia, especially Fārs. It is an important book because of accurate renditions with Qajar style—of the reliefs and buildings at Persepolis.

== Onomastics ==
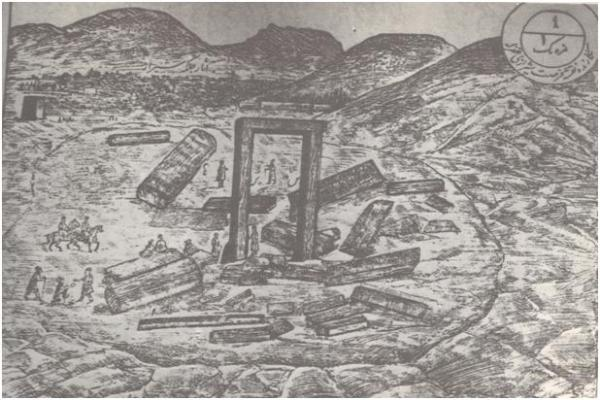
Another detail of Abu-Nasr Palace from the book

The title of the book Asar-e Ajam is an Arabic phrase which consists of two nouns; "Asar" (in Perso-Arabic alphabet: آثار) (or "Athar" in its original Arabic pronunciation) which means deeds, antiquities or monuments, and Ajam (in Perso-Arabic alphabet: عجم) which in Arabic literature refers to the Persians.

== Documentary ==
In 2016 Iranian documentary director Hassan Naghashi made a film named Asar-e Ajam which mainly dealt with the life of Forsat-od Dowla and most specifically the structure of the book and its publication.
