= Forsat-od-Dowleh Shirazi =

Iranian scholar, poet (1854 – 1920)

Mirza Forsat-od-Dowleh Shirazi
- فرصت‌الدوله شیرازی
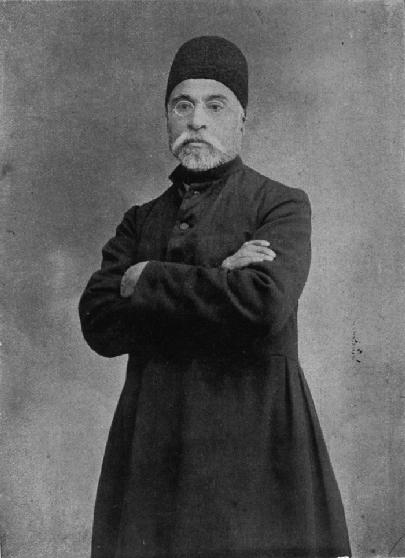
- Forsat-od-Dowleh Shirazi. After the frontispiece to his divan
- Born: Mohammad Naser-Hosseini; November 1854; Shiraz, Fars province, Iran
- Died: 23 October 1920 (aged 65); Shiraz, Fars province, Iran
- Resting place: near the Tomb of Hafez
- Occupations: poet, scholar, artist
- Writing career
- Language: Persian, Arabic
- Period: 1880s – 1910s

Mirza Mohammad Nasir-al-Hosseini (b. November 1854 – d. 23 October 1920; Persian: میرزا محمد نصیرالحسینی), better known by his pen name Forsat-od-Dowleh (فرصت‌الدوله), and more commonly Forsat-e Shirazi (فرصت شیرازی), was a poet, scholar, and artist during the Qajar era. (Note: He was also known as Mirzā Āghā (میرزا آقا) and Mirzā-ye Forsat (میرزای فرصت). His pen name is also spelled as Forsat-al-Dawla.)

== Biography and works ==
Forsat-od-Dowleh was born in Shiraz, Fars province. He started his education when he was six years old, and by the time he reached the age of eleven, he excelled in Persian and was proficient in Arabic as well as the "elementary sciences".

Forsat-od-Dowleh acted as an "intermediary and peacemaker" during clashes between factions in Shiraz on two occasions; one of them in 1910 between the Qashqai and the Khamseh, and once in 1916, when the German consulate in Shiraz was presumed to be the "instigator of the unrest".

Forsat-od-Dowleh died in 1920 at his home in Shiraz of a chronic illness his stomach and kidney function. He was buried near the tomb of Hafez.

He was skilled in Persian and Arabic literature. He founded The Fars newspaper in 1913.

Forsat od-Dowleh was among the first contemporary Iranian scholars with serious interest in the language and history of ancient Iran. He learned the basics of cuneiform script from two Europeans at Shiraz and continued his linguistic study with the German linguist Oscar Mann and eventually wrote the Naḥw-o ṣarf-e khaṭṭ-e Āryā (نحو و صرف خط آریا) on the Old Persian cuneiform.

His other works include:

- The Divan, also called Dabestān al-forṣa, his collection of poems, including 10,000 verses in Persian and Arabic
- Āṯār-e ʿAjam ("The Works of Ajam"): a travelogue and a collection of drawings of historical sites of Persia, especially Fars)
- Aškāl al-mīzān, on logic
- Moḵtaṣar-e joḡrāfiyā-ye Hendūstān ("A Concise Book on the Geography of India")
- Boḥūr al-alḥān
- Maṯnawī-e Hejr-nāma
- Tafṣīl-e enqelāb-e mašrūṭīyat
- Šaṭranjīya, on playing chess
- Maqālāt-e ʿelmī wa siyāsī

== Sources ==
- Kasheff, Manouchehr (1999). "FORṢAT-AL-DAWLA". Encyclopaedia Iranica, Vol. X, Fasc. 1. pp. 100–102.
