= List of magazines and newspapers of Fars =

List of magazines and newspapers of Fars classifies the newspapers and magazines of Fars province by the date first number was published.

| Name | City | Foundation | Historical era |
|---|---|---|---|
| Fars | Shiraz | 1872 | Qajar dynasty |
| Toloo | Bushehr | 1900 | Qajar dynasty |
| Mozaffari | Bushehr | 1901 | Qajar dynasty |
| Nedaye eslam | Shiraz | 1907 | Qajar dynasty |
| Okhovvat | Shiraz | 1908 | Qajar dynasty |
| Afagh | Shiraz | 1909 | Qajar dynasty |
| Darolelm | Shiraz | 1909 | Qajar dynasty |
| Nahid | Tehran | 1909 | Pahlavi dynasty |
| Hayat | Shiraz | 1910 | Qajar dynasty |
| The Fars | Shiraz | 1913 | Qajar dynasty |
| The World of Iran | Shiraz | 1920 | Qajar dynasty |
| Estakhr | Shiraz | 1981 | |
