= Iranian women and Persian music =

Since the Iranian revolution, Iranian female solo vocalists are permitted to perform for female audiences. Female vocalists can perform for male audiences only as a part of a chorus.

== History and background ==
The term Persian music has been equated with Persian traditional, Iranian traditional, Persian classical and Iranian classical music (Persian music). A distinction is made however between traditional and classical (regardless of whether Iranian or Persian) musical genres. Classical music is distinct from traditional in that it is based on dastgāh, defined as the standard musical system, consisting of a collection of musical melodies or figures (gushehs) based on seven modes. The repertoire developed from this system in the 19th century is called the Radif. Persian classical music (that which is composed based on the Radif) is associated with the following terms: sonnati (traditional), asil (authentic), honari (art), elmi (learned), and dastgahi. Persian/Iranian traditional or folk music, therefore, is associated with the term mahalli (that which is passed on through the oral tradition).

Before the Qajar Period (1785–1925) Iranian musicians were known as motrebs, but this term began to refer to musicians who performed in a variety of styles predominantly for "joyful" occasions, such as weddings and other festivities. Throughout this period various performing groups with criteria regarding participation of male and female musicians and appropriate performance spaces were established. These included mogalleds (mimics/actors) who often performed independent of any musical context and did not include women; and luti (dancers, musicians, jugglers, all-around entertainers), also without the involvement of women. Within the royal residences, where there were separate living quarters for males and females, performing groups of instrumentalists, singers, and dancers known as bazingars lived among the royalty. Under the rule of Naser al-Din Shah (r. 1848–1896) Iran experienced an increased interest in art or classical music and the introduction of Western musical influences.

The Constitutional Era (1905–11) is considered a time of greater feminist activism. During the Pahlavi era (1925–1979) under Riza Shah Pahlavi and his son Muhammad Riza-Pahlavi efforts were made to modernize Iran, (corresponding with the discovery of oil) especially through introduction of Western influences. Western and western-inspired popular music was encouraged, including more activity by women performers. In 1936 the Shah forced women to stop wearing the veil. and Iranian women were allowed greater involvement in society, along with improvements in education and the workplace. Eventually female motrebs became more important and plentiful than male motrebs, ultimately replacing them altogether.

The 1960s and 1970s, however, brought a backlash to the westernization of Iran,largely driven by fears of losing Iranian national culture and identity. With the Iranian (or Islamic) Revolution (1978–79), led by Ayatullah Khumeni (who overthrew the Shah), Sharia law "reform" was instituted, imposing religious (Islamic) values on many aspects of life, and introducing significant restrictions on music and women musicians. Between 1979 and 1989, popular music was banned entirely, allowing neither performing nor listening. In 1979 women were banned at first from singing altogether, then from singing or dancing solo before a mixed-gender audience (no "unrelated men"). Female vocalists could perform for male audiences only as a part of a chorus. In the 1980s some loosening of restrictions occurred; patriotic and religious hymns were allowed along with the use of western musical instruments. In 1981 however, women were once again required to wear a veil in public, and in 1983 the Islamic Punishment Law (Morality Police) was established. By 1988 and the end of the Iran/Iraq War; the ban on the sale/use of instruments was lifted.

With restrictions placed on women musicians after the 1979 Islamic Revolution, female musicians went "underground" or immigrated to other countries where they could perform freely. For example, after 1986 Maryam Akhondy, the classical trained singer from Tehran, started working with other Iranian musicians in exile. She founded Ensemble Barbad, a group of traditional Iranian art musicians and in 2000 created the all-female a cappella group Banu as a kind of musical expedition to the different regions and cultures of Iran. For this project, the singer collected old folk songs over several years which would have been sung only in a private atmosphere. She strove to bring traditional women's songs into public performance. The diaspora of Iranian musicians (both male and female) resulted in development of communities of expatriates. One such community in Southern California is Tehrangeles, known for its music industry serving expatriate Iranian musicians.

Female musicians, especially those performing traditional Persian/Iranian music, have used (and continue to use) materiality (gestures, dance, costumes, types of performances/genres) as mnemonic devices in their performances. This materiality serves as a link to their homeland and culture. Within Iran, these costumes also served to avert suspicion from Islamic Cultural authorities. The well-known classical and folk singer. Sima Bina, who is also a visual artist, performs in traditional Iranian attire. She has been permitted to give concerts for women in Iran and has performed widely abroad. Additionally, she has taught many female students how to sing.

The year 1989 brought the death of Supreme Leader Ayatullah Khumeni, who was replaced by Supreme Leader Ali Khameni. This coincided with the election of President Akbar Hashemi Rafsanjāni, who was considered a "pragmatic conservative". With this change in leadership, Iran experienced a loosening of restrictions, albeit accompanied by a continued resistance to Western influences, and in turn this led to a greater interest in learning traditional Iranian music. Traditional music ensembles were allowed, but women were still forbidden from solo singing for mixed audiences. In addition, the performance of more popular music was permitted; and the 1997 presidential election of reformist Muhammed Khatami restored music concerts and broadcasts. Women however continued to face performance restrictions, including the prohibition from singing on national TV. Performers, nevertheless, devised ways to circumvent some restrictions. These included the practice of "co-singing," i.e. solo singing until government officials appear and then immediately switching to choral singing, as well as the tactic known as "peek-a-boo solos," which consisted of performances of co- and choral singing with interjections of solo singing. Often "co and choral" singing with a soloist was so soft that it became no more than an accompaniment.

The establishment of the Ministry of Culture and Islamic Guidance (1979) and with it the institution of mujāwwiz--the state-issued authorization for release or performance of music—has severely curtailed music recording and live performances. The development of the Internet however, has made virtual performances possible and established an "underground" dissemination of Iranian music, resulting in international recognition of these performers. To this end new terms have evolved for pop music, distinguishing legal music from underground, alternative, or urban styles.

The 2005-2013 presidential term of conservative Mahmoud Ahmadīnijād resulted once again in movement toward more restrictions, including a ban on Western music. It was followed by a loosening of restrictions under moderate Pres. Hassan Rouhani (2013–21). Over time musicians have become more successful in their attempts to get around restrictions, facilitated by less scrutiny by the authorities.

Ghashang Kamkar, the lone female musician in the family musical group The Kamkars, teaches both male and female students. Both Ghashang and Fātemeh Vā'ezi (better known as Parisa) have criticized the patriarchal power structure for its primitive treatment of female artists.

== Persian classical music ==
Qamar ol-Molouk Vaziri is believed to have been the first female master of Persian Classical Music to introduce a new style of music and receive a positive reputation among masters of Persian music during her own lifetime.

Several years later, Mahmoud Karimi trained several female students who later became masters of Persian traditional music.

- Maryam Akhondy, founder of Barbad Ensemble and former member of Tschakawak
- Arfa Atrai, Santur musician and writer
- Soosan Matloobi, Master of Persian classical music
- Fatemeh Vaezi or better known as Parisa, Master of Persian classical music
- Masoomeh Mehr-Ali, Master of Persian classical music
- Soosan Aslani, Master of Persian classical music
- Shakila, singer, winner of Persian Academy Award.
- Delkash
- Simin Ghanem
- Soodabeh Salem, musician and conductor
- Afsaneh Rasaei, member of Hamavayan ensemble
- Pirayeh Pourafar, founder of Nava Ensemble and Lian Ensemble
- Mehrbanou Goudarzi
- Mahsa Vahdat
- Mandana Khazraei

== Persian/Iranian folk-music ==
- Pari Zangeneh
- Sima Bina
- Mitra Rahbar
- Monika Jalili
- Ziba Shirazi
- Zohreh Jooya
- Shushā Guppy

== Persian symphonic music ==
- Lily Afshar, world class guitarist.
- Afarin Mansouri, composer.

== Iranian popular music ==
Many female pioneers in Iranian pop music were initially trained in classical Persian music. Maestro Ali Tajvidi in particular trained many female students (e.g.Hayedeh) that later on shifted to popular music. Some pioneers are:

- Hayedeh
- Mahasti
- Googoosh
- Leila Forouhar
- Pooran
- Sima Mafiha
- Faravaz Farvardin
- Ezzat Rouhbakhsh

== Iranian-born musicians in other genres ==
- Azam Ali
- Cymin Samawatie
- Laleh Pourkarim
- Anousha Nazari

== See also ==
- Music of Iran
- Iranian women's movement
- List of Iranian musicians
