= Pouya Saraei =

Iranian composer and musician

Pouya Saraei پویا سرایی
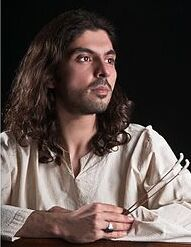
- Saraei in 2018

Background information
- Born: 18 April 1983 (age 43); Tehran
- Genres: Persian classical music; symphonic music; chamber music
- Occupations: Composer; arranger; conductor; lecturer; musician; researcher
- Labels: Sony Music; Navona Records Naxoslicensing; IDAGIO; Delawaz; Avaye barbad; Naxos Records; Centaur Records; Robamusic

Pouya Saraei (Persian: پویا سرایی) is an Iranian composer, arranger, conductor, lecturer, music critic, researcher, and musician.

== Career ==
Saraei began playing the santur at age seven, taking lessons from Javad Bathaie, Faramarz Payvar, Hossein Alizadeh, Pashang Kamkar, Dariush Talai, Mostafa Kamal Pourtorab, Hassan Riahi, Sharif Lotfi, Farid Omran, Majid Derakhshani, and Mohammad-Reza Lotfi.

He has played the instrument on over 220 musical projects, including on Schiller's album Morgenstund, which topped the German music charts, and the first track of Modes, composed by Karen Keyhani and published by Navona Records. He worked on the album In The Name Of The Red Rose with Dastan Ensemble and Salar Aghili.

Saraei performed in Europe as a part of the "Simorq" project, conducted by Hooman Khalatbari, performed by Homayoun Shajarian, and composed by Hamid Motebassem. He has composed and arranged several works, including Gahi, Segahi, a Persian traditional music album. His second album, In Sare Sodaei, was a collaboration with Pejman Hadadi. He has played with the Eshtiagh Orchestra and Alireza Ghorbani in Iran, as well as in music festivals in Switzerland, China, and France. Saraei has conducted the orchestra for the Komitas State Conservatory of Yerevan. His works were showcased in an exhibition during the Vienna International Book Fair.

Saraei holds a PhD in art studies from Tehran University and is a professor and maestro at Tehran University of Art, University of Tehran, and Islamic Azad University. He is on the editorial board of the Mehregani Magazine and has written multiple articles and critical reviews. He is also one of the speakers and performers in international conference of persian music at Martin Luther University of Halle-Wittenberg in Germany.

He also serves on the Evaluation Committee of the Ninth International Composition Competition "Carlo Sanvitale" 2026, held in Italy.

== Accolades ==
List of awards won by Pouya Saraei
Event	Title	Role	Track name
Global Music Awards	Silver Medal in Composition	Composer	Boghz
Hafez Awards	Best Composer of Persian traditional music	Composer	Boghz
Hafez Awards	Best Singer of Persian traditional and fusion music for Salar Aghili	Composer	Ghoghnoos
Hafez Awards	Best Singer of Persian traditional and fusion music for Homayoun Shajarian	Composer	Dorre Dordaneh
Hafez Awards	Best Composer of Persian traditional and fusion music	Composer	Dorre Dordaneh

== Discography ==
=== Albums ===
- Gahi segahi (composer), sung by Mohammad Motamedi
- In Sare Sodaei (composer) with Pejman Hadadi

=== Other works ===
- "Ey jane jan bi man maro", sung by Homayoun Shajarian
- "In the Name of the Red Rose", sung by Salar Aghili
- "As Far as Possible" on Modes (Soloist) Released by Navona Records
- "Aeene Farzanegi" (arranger and composer) sung by Salar Aghili
- "Bahaare Delkash" sung by Salar Aghili
- "Chakad e Honar" (arranger and composer) sung by Ali Zand Vakili
- "Shamsozzoha" (arranger and composer), sung by Hesamoddin Seraj
- "Janan" (composer)
- "Sarandaz" (arrangement) composed by Parviz Meshkatian
- "Khayyam recital" composed by Peyman Soltani
- "Dauntless" (arranger) sung by Mohammad Motamedi
- "Hidden Found"
- "Hafez" (composer) sung by Sadeq Sheikhzadeh
- "Shab-E Bi Setareh" (composer), sung by Ghaffar Zabeh
- "Chaharmezrabe Esfahan" (arranger)
- "The Legend of Your Face" (composer)
- "The Rain" (composer)
- "Moment" (composer)
- Morgenstund composed by Schiller (band)
- "Zaayandeh-Roud", rhapsody for symphonic orchestra (composer), published by IDAGIO
- "Desert", santur with ensemble and orchestra (composer), published by East Music.
- "Intuition", Instrumental. Published by East Music.
- "My Iran" for symphonic orchestra (Composer). Published by East Music.
- "Roshana", santur (improvisation), published by East Music.
- "Sensation", santur (improvisation), published by East Music.
- "Nava" for symphonic orchestra, published by Centaur Records.
- "Dorre Dordaneh"(Composer), sung by Homayoun Shajarian
- "Tanweer Festival", sung by Sami Yusuf
- "Lord of Rings" Project, in Istanbul
- "Sarmastam"(Composer), sung by Homayoun Shajarian
- "Irane Roshan"(Composer), sung by Homayoun Shajarian
