= Tahmasebi =

Tahmasebi or Tahmasbi (Persian: طهماسبی) is an Iranian surname that may refer to

- Alireza Tahmasbi, Iranian politician
- Amir Abdollah Tahmasebi (1881–1928), Iranian military commander
- Arshad Tahmasbi, Iranian musician
- Bahman Tahmasebi (born 1980), Iranian football striker
- Erfan Tahmasbi, Iranian musician
- Khalil Tahmasebi (died 1955), Iranian Islamist
- Mehrdad Tahmasebi (born 1985), Iranian football goalkeeper
- Mohammad Reza Tahmasebi (born 1976), Iranian football player
- Raheleh Tahmasbi, Iranian sea captain
- Saman Tahmasebi (born 1985), Iranian-Azerbaijani wrestler
- Sussan Tahmasebi, Iranian women's rights advocate

== See also ==
- Tehmasabi, village in Lorestan, Iran
- Nowtarki-ye Tahmasebi, village in Khuzestan, Iran
