= Raheleh =

Raheleh (Persian: راحله) is a feminine given name. Notable people with the given name include:

- Raheleh Ahmadi, Iranian political prisoner
- Raheleh Asemani, Belgian taekwondo athlete
- Raheleh Filsoofi (born 1975), Iranian and American artist, educator
- Raheleh Rahemipour, Iranian human rights activist
- Raheleh Tahmasbi, Iranian sea captain
- Raheleh Zomorodinia, Iranian-born American visual artist

== See also ==
- Rahila, feminine given name
