= Charles Goodwin (semiotician) =

American linguist

Charles Goodwin (1943 – March 31, 2018) was a UCLA distinguished research professor of communication and key member of UCLA's Center for Language, Interaction and Culture. Goodwin contributed ground-breaking theory and research on social interaction and opened new pathways for research on eye gaze, storytelling, turn-taking and action.

== Biography ==
Goodwin worked in the field of social welfare before entering academia. He was a caseworker for the New York City Department of Welfare, and a filmmaker for the Developmental Center for Autistic Children in Philadelphia and the Philadelphia Child Guidance Clinic.

After receiving a BS in English from Holy Cross, and a law degree from New York University School of Law, Charles Goodwin was awarded his doctorate in linguistics in 1977 by the University of Pennsylvania, Graduate School of Arts and Sciences. From that point on he made contributions to the field of interactional linguistics, (sociolinguistics, linguistic anthropology). He and his wife, Marjorie Harness Goodwin, collectively and individually opened up avenues of inquiry in interaction. His UCLA page lists his interests in "Human Action, Video Analysis of Embodied Talk in Interaction, Distributed Cognition, Aphasia in Discourse, Gesture, Ethnography of Science."

After leaving Philadelphia, Goodwin taught anthropology at the University of South Carolina before he and his wife both became instructors at UCLA, he in the Communications Department, and she in the Anthropology Department.

His commitment to colleagues and to scientific inquiry is made manifest in the organizations of which he was a member: the American Anthropological Association, the American Association for Applied Linguistics, the Society for Linguistic Anthropology, the International Pragmatics Association, the Society for Visual Anthropology and the Committee on Computing as a Cultural Process.

Nick Enfield, a linguistic anthropologist, reviewed Goodwin's final book, “Co-Operative Action,” and offered a shining characterization of Goodwin as “one of the most creative, insightful, and unfettered scholars of human social action in interaction.”

== Overview of major works ==
- "Professional Vision" (1994)

In this influential essay, Goodwin argues that people can learn to 'see' complex phenomena based on the discursive practices of professionals, which he aligns with socially situated accounts of human action, in contrast to approaches which focus exclusively on psychological abilities. He compares, on the one hand, the techniques of an expert archaeologist for teaching a novice, and on the other hand, the strategies that lawyers in the Rodney King trial used to convince the jury that King was a danger to the officers who beat him. In the case of the King trial, the result of these processes is that "the massive beating is...transformed into ten separate events" (p. 617), allowing the lawyers to systematically guide the attention and meaning making of the jury:

One of the defense attorneys in the first trial had photographs made from individual tape frames. The photos were cropped, enlarged, and pasted in sequence to form a display over a meter long that was placed in front of the jury on an easel. The salience of King in these images was amplified through use of highlighting. As the defense attorney unveiled his display, he placed clear overlays with large white lines outlining King's body on top of the photos (see Figure 8). Earlier we saw an archaeologist weave a post mold into existence by drawing a line through subtle patches of color differences in a bit of dirt. Here the defense attorney uses similar procedures for enhancing objects in the domain of scrutiny to call forth from the murky pixels on the video screen the discursive object that is the point of his argument, a large, violent, charging African-American man who was so dangerous that hitting him 47 times with metal clubs was reasonable and justified.

Across these two examples, Goodwin identifies several discursive practices they share in common—coding, highlighting, and graphical representation—that allow professionals to turn a complex and confusing 'field' into "objects of knowledge" (p. 628) for non-professional actors. Crucially, Goodwin argues that these practices depend on common forms of human cognition, but that communities of practice have access to certain categories and techniques, which can be a source of authority.

== Publications ==
- Charles Goodwin, (2017), "Co-Operative Action", Cambridge University Press.
- Charles Goodwin, (2016), "L'organisation co-opérative et transformative de l'action et du savoir humains", Tracés. Revue de Sciences humaines, vol. #16, pp. 19–46.
- Charles Goodwin, (2015), "Narrative as Talk-in-Interaction", In The Handbook of Narrative Analysis (Anna De Fina, Alexandra Georgakopoulou, eds.), London, John Wiley & Sons, Inc, pp. 195–218.
- Charles Goodwin, (2015), "Professional Vision", In Aufmerksamkeit: Geschichte - Theorie - Empirie (Sabine Reh, Kathrin Berdelmann, Jorg Dinkelaker, eds.), pp. 387–425.
- Charles Goodwin, (2014), "The intelligibility of gesture within a framework of co-operative action", In From gesture in conversation to visible action as utterance: Essays in honor of Adam Kendon (Mandana Seyfeddinipur, Marianne Gullberg, eds.), Amsterdam, John Benjamins Publishing Company, pp. 199–216.
- Charles Goodwin, (2013), "The co-operative, transformative organization of human action and knowledge", Journal of Pragmatics, Elsevier B.V., vol. 46, no. 1, pp. 8–23.
- Marjorie Harness Goodwin, Asta Cekaite, Charles Goodwin, Eve Tulbert, (2012), "Emotion as stance", In Emotion in interaction (Anssi Peräkylä, M-L. Sorjonen, eds.), New York, Oxford University Press, pp. 16–41.
- Marjorie Harness Goodwin, Charles Goodwin, (2012), "Car talk: Integrating texts, bodies, and changing landscapes", Semiotica, no. 191, pp. 257–286.
- Timothy Koschmann, Curtis LeBaron, Charles Goodwin, Paul Feltovich, (2011), "“Can you see the cystic artery yet?” A simple matter of trust", Journal of Pragmatics, Elsevier B.V., vol. 43, no. 2, pp. 521–541.
- Charles Goodwin, (2011), "Contextures of Action", In Embodied Interaction: Language and Body in the Material World (Jürgen Streeck, Charles Goodwin, Curtis LeBaron, eds.), New York, Cambridge University Press, pp. 182–193.
- Charles Goodwin, (2010), "Things and Their Embodied Environments", In The Cognitive Life of Things: Recasting Boundaries of the Mind (Lambros Malafouris, Colin Renfrew, eds.), Cambridge, UK, McDonald Institute for Archaeological Research, pp. 103–120.
- Charles Goodwin, (2010), "Constructing Meaning through Prosody in Aphasia", In Prosody in Interaction (Dagmar Barth-Weingarten, Elisabeth Reber, Margret Selting, eds.), Amsterdam; Philadelphia, John Benjamins, pp. 373–394.
- Timothy Koschmann, Curtis LeBaron, Charles Goodwin, Alan Zemel, Gary Dunnington, (2007), "Formulating the triangle of doom", Gesture, vol. 7, no. 1, pp. 97–118.
- Charles Goodwin, (2007), "Environmentally Coupled Gestures", In Gesture and the dynamic dimension of language (Susan D. Duncan, Justine Cassel, Elena T. Levy, eds.), Amsterdam / Philadelphia, John Benjamins Publishing Company, pp. 195–212.
- Charles Goodwin, (2007), "Interactive Footing", In Reporting talk Reported speech in interaction (Elisabeth Holt, Rebecca Clift, eds.), Cambridge University Press.
- Charles Goodwin, (2007), "Participation, Stance, and Affect in the Organization of Activities", Discourse and Society, vol. 18, no. 1, pp. 53–73.
- Timothy Koschmann, Curtis LeBaron, Charles Goodwin, Paul Feltovich, (2006), "The mystery of the missing referent: objects, procedures, and the problem of the instruction follower", In CSCW '06: Proceedings of the 2006 20th anniversary conference on Computer supported cooperative work, New York, NY, USA, ACM, pp. 373–382.
- Charles Goodwin, (2006), "Human Sociality as Mutual Orientation in a Rich Interactive Environment: Multimodal Utterances and Pointing in Aphasia", In Roots of Human Sociality (Nicholas J. Enfield, Stephen C. Levinson, eds.), London, Berg, pp. 96–125.
- Charles Goodwin, (2006), "Retrospective and Prospective Orientation in the Construction of Argumentative Moves", Text & Talk, vol. 26, no. 4–5, pp. 443–461.
- Charles Goodwin, (2004), "A Competent Speaker Who Can't Speak: The Social Life of Aphasia", Journal of Linguistic Anthropology, vol. 14, no. 2, pp. 151–170.
- Charles Goodwin, Marjorie H Goodwin, (2004), "Participation", In A companion to Linguistic Anthropology (Alessandro Duranti, ed.), Oxford (Blackwell), pp. 222–244.
- Charles Goodwin, (2003), "The Body in Action", In Discourse, the Body and Identity (Justine Coupland, Richard Gwyn, eds.), New York, Palgrave Macmillan, pp. 19–42.
- Charles Goodwin, (2003), "Embedded Context", Research on Language and Social Interaction, vol. 36, no. 4, pp. 323–350.
- Charles Goodwin, (2003), "Conversational Frameworks for the Accomplishment of Meaning in Aphasia", In Conversation and Brain Damage (Charles Goodwin, ed.), New York, Oxford University Press, pp. 90–116.
- Charles Goodwin, (2003), "Introduction", In Conversation and Brain Damage (Charles Goodwin, ed.), New York, Oxford University Press, pp. 3–20.
- Charles Goodwin, (2003), "Conversation and Brain Damage", Oxford, Oxford University Press, pp. 328.
- Charles Goodwin, (2003), "Recognizing Assessable Names", In Studies in Language and Social Interaction: In Honor of Robert Hopper (Phillip Glenn, Curtis D. LeBaron, Jenny Mandelbaum, eds.), Mahweh, NJ, Lawrence Erlbaum, pp. 151–161.
- Charles Goodwin, (2003), "Pointing as Situated Practice", In Pointing: Where Language, Culture and Cognition Meet (Kita Sotaro, N J Mahwah, eds.), Lawrence Erlbaum, pp. 217–241.
- Marjorie Harness Goodwin, Charles Goodwin, Malcah Yaeger-Dror, (2002), "Multi-Modality in Girls' Game Disputes", Journal of Pragmatics, vol. 34, no. 10–11, pp. 1621–1649.
- Charles Goodwin, Marjorie Harness Goodwin, David Olsher, (2002), "Producing Sense with Nonsense Syllables: Turn and Sequence in Conversations with a Man with Severe Aphasia", In The Language of Turn and Sequence (Cecilia E. Ford, Barbara A. Fox, Sandra A. Thompson, eds.), Oxford, Oxford University Press, pp. 56–80.
- Charles Goodwin, (2002), "Time in Action", Current Anthropology, vol. 43, no. S4, pp. 19–35.
- Marjorie Harness Goodwin, Charles Goodwin, (2000), "Emotion within Situated Activity", In Linguistic Anthropology: A Reader (Alessandro Duranti, ed.), Malden, MA, Blackwell, pp. 239–257.
- Marjorie Harness Goodwin, Charles Goodwin, (2000), "Emotion within Situated Activity", In Communication: An Arena of Development (Nancy Budwig, Ina Č. Užgiris, James V. Wertsch, eds.), Stemford, CT, Ablex, pp. 33–54.
- Charles Goodwin, (2000), "Gesture, Aphasia and Interaction", In Language and Gesture (David McNeill, ed.), New York, Cambridge University Press, pp. 84–98.
- Charles Goodwin, (2000), "Practices of Color Classification", Mind, Culture, and Activity, vol. 7, no. 1–2, pp. 19–36.
- Charles Goodwin, (2000), "Practices of Seeing: Visual Analysis - An Ethnomethodological Approach", In Handbook of Visual Analysis (Theo van Leeuwen, Carey Jewitt, eds.), London, Sage Publications, pp. 157–182.
- Charles Goodwin, (2000), "Action and embodiment within situated human interaction", Journal of Pragmatics, vol. 32, no. 10, pp. 1489–1522.
- Charles Goodwin, Marjorie Harness Goodwin, (1997), "La coopération au travail dans un aéroport", Réseaux, vol. 15, no. 85, pp. 129–162.
- Charles Goodwin, Marjorie Harness Goodwin, (1997), "Contested Vision: The Discursive Constitution of Rodney King", In The Construction of Professional Discourse (Britt-Louise Gunarsson, Per Linell, Bengt Nordberg, eds.), New York, Longman, pp. 292–316.
- Charles Goodwin, (1997), "The Blackness of Black: Color Categories as Situated Practice", In Discourse, Tools and Reasoning: Essays on Situated Cognition (Lauren B. Resnick, Roger Säljö, Clotilde Pontecorvo, Barbara Burge, eds.), Springer, pp. 111–140.
- Charles Goodwin, Marjorie Harness Goodwin, (1996), "Seeing as Situated Activity: Formulating Planes", In Cognition and Communication at Work (Yrjö Engeström, David Middleton, eds.), New York, Cambridge University Press, pp. 61–95. [bibtex] [edit]
- Charles Goodwin, (1996), "Transparent Vision", In Interaction and Grammar (Elinor Ochs, Emanuel A. Schegloff, Sandra A. Thompson, eds.), New York, Cambridge University Press, pp. 370–404.
- Charles Goodwin, (1995), "Seeing in Depth", Social Studies of Science, vol. 25, no. 2, pp. 237–274.
- Charles Goodwin, (1995), "The negotiation of coherence within conversation", In Coherence in Spontaneous Text (Morton Ann Gernsbacher, T. Givón, eds.), Amsterdam, John Benjamins Publishing Company, vol. 31, pp. 117–137.
- Charles Goodwin, (1995), "Sentence Construction within Interaction", In Aspects of Oral Communication (Uta Quastoff, ed.), Berlin, New York, De Gruyter Mouton, pp. 198–219.
- Charles Goodwin, (1995), "Co-constructing Meaning in Conversations with an Aphasic Man", Research on Language and Social Interaction, vol. 28, no. 3, pp. 233–260.
- Charles Goodwin, (1994), "Professional Vision", American Anthropologist, vol. 96, no. 3, pp. 606–633.
- Charles Goodwin, (1993), "Recording human interaction in natural settings", Pragmatics, vol. 3, no. 2, pp. 181–209.
- Charles Goodwin, Marjorie Harness Goodwin, (1992), "Context, Activity and Participation", In The Contextualization of Language (Peter Auer, Aldo Di Luzio, eds.), Amsterdam, John Benjamins Publishing Company, vol. 22, pp. 77–99.
- Charles Goodwin, Marjorie Harness Goodwin, (1992), "Assessments and the Construction of Context", In Rethinking Context: Language as an Interactive Phenomenon (Alessandro Duranti, Charles Goodwin, eds.), Cambridge, Cambridge University Press, pp. 147–190.
- Alessandro Duranti, Charles Goodwin, (1992), "Rethinking Context: An Introduction", In Rethinking Context: Language as an Interactive Phenomenon (Alessandro Duranti, Charles Goodwin, eds.), Cambridge, Cambridge University Press, pp. 1–42.
- Charles Goodwin, Marjorie Harness Goodwin, (1990), "Interstitial argument", In Conflict Talk (Allen Grimshaw, ed.), Cambridge, Cambridge University Press, pp. 85–117.
- Charles Goodwin, John Heritage, (1990), "Conversation Analysis", Annual Review of Anthropology, vol. 19, pp. 283–307.
- Charles Goodwin, (1989), "Turn Construction and Conversational Organization", In Rethinking Communication: Paradigm Exemplars (Brenda Dervin, Larry Grossberg, Barbara O'Keefe, Ellen Wartella, eds.), Newbury Park, CA, Sage, pp. 88–102.
- Charles Goodwin, (1988), "Participation Frameworks in Children's Argument", In rowing Into A Modern World: Proceedings from An International Interdisciplinary Conference on the Life and Development of Children in Modern Society (Karin Ekberg, Per Egil Mjaavatn, eds.), Trondheim, The Norwegian Centre for Child Research, pp. 1188–1195.
- Marjorie Harness Goodwin, Charles Goodwin, (1987), "Children's arguing", In Language, Gender, and Sex in Comparative Perspective (Susan Philips, Susan Steele, Christine Tanz, eds.), Cambridge, Cambridge University Press, pp. 200–248.
- Charles Goodwin, (1987), "La référence exophorique comme procédé interactif", Cahiers de praxématique, vol. 9, pp. 9–22.
- Charles Goodwin, (1987), "Unilateral Departure", In Talk and Social Organisation (Graham Button, John R E Lee, eds.), Clevedon, England, Multilingual Matters, pp. 206–216.
- Charles Goodwin, Marjorie Harness Goodwin, (1987), "Concurrent Operations on Talk: Notes on the Interactive Organization of Assessments", IPrA Papers in Pragmatics, vol. 1, no. 1, pp. 1–55.
- Charles Goodwin, (1987), "Forgetfulness as an Interactive Resource", Social Psychology Quarterly, vol. 50, no. 2, pp. 115–130.
- Marjorie Harness Goodwin, Charles Goodwin, (1986), "Gesture and coparticipation in the activity of searching for a word", Semiotica, vol. 62, no. 1–2, pp. 51–75.
- Charles Goodwin, (1986), "Gestures as a resource for the organization of mutual orientation", Semiotica, vol. 62, no. 1–2, pp. 29–49.
- Charles Goodwin, (1986), "Between and within: Alternative sequential treatments of continuers and assessments", Human Studies, vol. 9, no. 2–3, pp. 205–217.
- Charles Goodwin, (1986), "Audience Diversity, Participation and Interpretation", Text, vol. 6, no. 3, pp. 283–316.
- Charles Goodwin, (1984), "Notes on story structure and the organization of participation", In Structures of social action: Studies in Conversation Analysis (J. Maxwell Atkinson, and John Heritage, eds.), London, Cambridge University Press, pp. 225–246.
- Charles Goodwin, (1981), "Exophoric Reference as an Interactive Resource", In Semiotics (John N. Deely, Margot D. Lenhart, eds.), New York, Plenum Press, pp. 119–128.
- Charles Goodwin, (1981), "Conversational Organization: Interaction between Speakers and Hearers", London, Academic Press.
- Charles Goodwin, (1980), "Restarts, Pauses, and the Achievement of a State of Mutual Gaze at Turn-Beginning", Sociological Inquiry, vol. 50, no. 3–4, pp. 272–302.
- Charles Goodwin, (1979), "The Interactive Construction of a Sentence in Natural Conversation", In Everyday Language: Studies in Ethnomethodology (George Psathas, ed.), New York, Irvington Publishers, pp. 97– 121.
