= Hermes Records =

Iranian music recording label

- Founded: 1999
- Founder: Ramin Sadighi
- Genre: World music Contemporary; Classical; Jazz
- Country of origin: Iran
- Location: Tehran
- Official website: Official Web site

Hermes Records is an independent record label founded in Tehran, Iran, in 1999 by Ramin Sadighi. Under the slogan music for music, Hermes has published and produced mainly contemporary Persian music.

Hermes Records has published different styles and genres of contemporary Persian music, as well as interactions between western and oriental musical textures and harmonies. It has been described as having "almost singlehandedly built a much needed platform for artists and fans of genuinely experimental Iranian music". The label is officially distributed in Iran, Turkey, Italy, UK, France, Germany, Greece & BeNeLux.

== Genres ==
Ramin Sadighi (CEO of Hermes Records) has produced different styles of contemporary Persian musicians. The label does not produce strictly classical Persian music and pop music, as they have their own labels, and vocal music by women is censored by the government of contemporary Iran.

In a 2009 article for MERIP, Sadighi and Mahdavi described the evolution of the post-revolutionary music scene in Iran, its subversive character, and Western misconceptions of underground and rock music in Iran.

== Selection of musicians ==
Ahmad Pejman, Alireza Mashayekhi, Hossein Alizadeh, Dušan Bogdanović, Peyman Yazdanian, Pejman Hadadi, Hooshyar Khayam, Nima A Rowshan, Sahba Aminikia, Quartet Diminished

== Awards and nominations ==
- 2006: Label of the year at Fajr International Music Festival
- 2007: Grammy Awards – Endless Vision by Hossein Alizadeh, Jivan Gasparyan – nominated
- 2015: Womex Award for Professional Excellence
