= Mehran Mehrnia =

Mehran Mehrnia مهران مهرنیا
- Born: July 13, 1969 (age 56); Hamedan, Iran
- Genres: Classical Persian Music
- Occupations: Musician, composer
- Instruments: Tar, Setar
- Years active: 1990–present

Mehran Mehrnia (Persian: مهران مهرنیا; born 13 July 1969) is an Iranian classical musician, tar and setar player and composer. He is the founder and the lead performer of Homayoun Ensemble.

Mehrnia has published several albums including Naghmeh-ye Hamrazan collaboration with Iranian singer Salar Aghili and Tale'e Mehr based on old Tasnifs by Abdollah Tale Hamedani. Mehrnia has led several group performances of Iranian classical music outside Iran including in Estonia, Poland and Vietnam. Mehrnia has worked with Iranian musician Mohammad-Reza Lotfi and after Lotfi's death, Mehrnia has performances has been dedicated to Lotfi's memory. Mehrnia composed and published a song in collaboration with Salar Aghili in memory of the Iranian healthcare workers who lost their lives during the pandemic. Homayoun Ensemble led by Mehrnia and with Sepideh Jandaghi and Hana Kamkar as singers performed in the Babylon International Festival.
