= Mandana (given name) =

Mandana is both a Sanskrit (मण्डन, Maṇḍana, 'criteria, norm') masculine and a Persian (ماندانا, Māndānā, 'lasting, immortal, eternal, everlasting, happy, heartwarming') feminine given name. Notable people with the name include:

== Given name ==
- Mandana Dayani (born 1982), American branding, technology, and fashion expert
- Mandana Jones (born 1967), British actress
- Mandana Karimi (born 1988), Iranian actress and model
- Mandana Khazraei (born 1980), Iranian musician
- Maṇḍana Miśra, 8th-century Hindu philosopher
- Mandana Moghaddam (born 1962), Iranian-Swedish visual artist
- Mandana Seyfeddinipur (born 1967), Iranian linguist
- Mandana Coleman Thorp (1843–1916), American Civil War nurse, singer, patriot; public official
- Abigail Mandana Holmes Christensen (1852–1938), American collector of folklore
