= Mohammad Motamedi =

Iranian vocalist, and a ney player (born 1978)

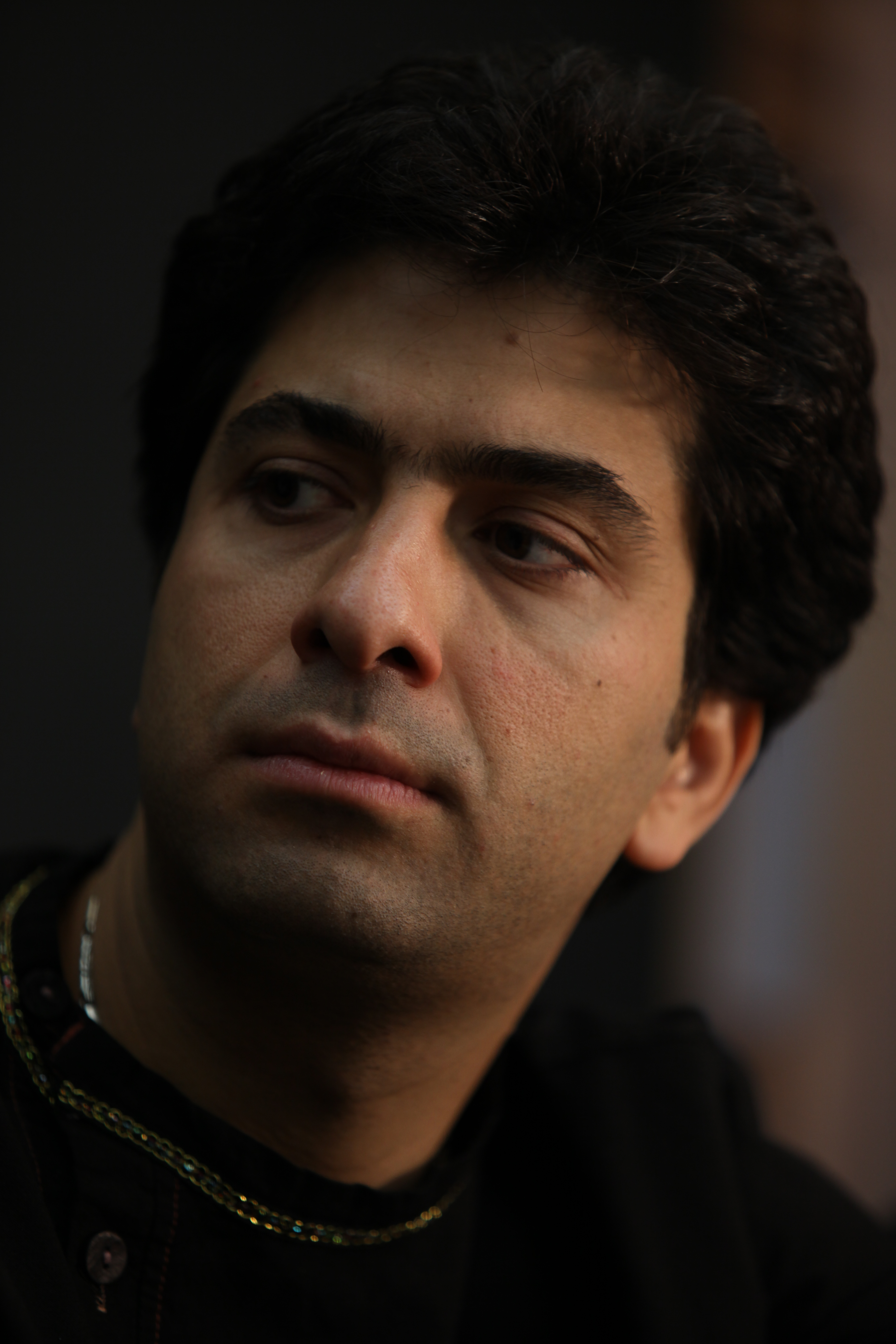

Background information
- Born: September 24, 1978 (age 47); Kashan, Iran
- Origin: Iranian
- Genres: Persian traditional music, classical
- Occupation: Singer
- Years active: 1997–present
- Website: www.mohammadmotamedi.com

Seyyed Mohammad Motamedi (Persian: محمد معتمدی; born September 24, 1978) is an Iranian traditional vocalist and a ney player.

He started learning to sing and play the ney in adolescence, teaching himself by listening to the works of maestros of Persian singing. He studied "Film Directing" as his major in university. In 1997, he started learning the singing style of Seyed Hossein Taherzadeh. He became interested in the Isfahan school of singing and learned by practicing the songs of its maestros such as Taj Esfahani and Adib Khansari and has benefitted from guidance of masters such as the late Hossein Omoumi and Aliasghar Shahzeidi.

He has a resume ranging from working with the maestros of Iranian music such as Alexander Rahbari, Mohammadreza Lotfi, Hossein Alizadeh, Majid Derakhshani, Farhad Fakhreddini, etc. to as working with international figures and performances in venues such as Carnegie Hall, Theatre de la ville, Muziekgebouw Amsterdam, etc. He also collaborated with Roger Waters in an album by Trio Jobran called "The Long March".

== Discography ==
- Boodan Va Soroudan (Majid Derakhshani & Khorshid Ensembl (Sun Ensembl)-2006
- Sufi (Mohammad Motamedi, Sina Jahanabadi & Hossein Rezaeinia)-2007
- Ashoora Opera(Behzad Abdi & Behrouz Gharibpour )-2008
- Vatanam Iran (Mohammad Reza Lotfi & Hamnavazan-e Sheida (Sheyda Ensembl)-2008
- Video Album of Dashti Concert– Vatanam Iran (Mohammad Reza Lotfi & Sheida Threefold Groups)-2008
- In Memory Of Aref Ghazvini (Aref Ghazvini & Mohammad Reza Lotfi)-2009
- Ey Asheghan (Mohammad Reza Lotfi & Banovan-e Sheida (Sheida Women's Ensemble)-2009
- Rumi Opera (Behzad Abdi & Behrouz Gharibpour)-2009
- Video Album of Chavosh Concert – Iran Ey Saraye Omid (Mohammad Reza Lotfi & Hamnavazan-e Sheida (Sheyda Ensembl) -2009
- Saye- e Jan (Mohammad Reza Lotfi & Sheyda Ensembl)-2010
- So Long Goodbye (Ali Ghamsari)-2010
- Gahi Segahi (Pouya Saraei )-2011
- Overwhelmed By Mist (Arash kamvar )-2012
- Mohammad Motamedi & Chant Classique (Radio France)-2013
- Badeh Toei (Hossein Alizadeh & Hamavayan Ensemble)-2014
- In The Distance a Call (Mehdi Teimoori )-2015
- Pass (Ali Gamsari )-2015
- Eshghim Gal (Azari )-(Hossein Alizadeh & Hamavayan Ensemble)-2015
- Dauntless (with Ebrahim Tehranipour)-2017
- The Long March (with Trio Jobran and Roger Waters)-2018
- Told me where you are (Majid wafadar) 2018
- Sarmast (Majid Khalaj) 2018
- Wait (Mahyar Alizadeh) 2020

== Significant works ==
- Rumi Opera (Behzad Abdi & Behrouz Gharibpour-2009)
- Mohammad Motamedi & Chant Classique-2014
- The Long March (with Trio Jobran and Roger Waters)-2018

== Awards ==
- Radio France prize winner-2013
- Rumi Award- 2018

== Concerts ==
- Extemporization concert in theatre of Paris
- Concert in historical Palace of Versailles
- Concert at The Festival Of China-Shanghai-2005
- Concert in Rasa theatre – Otrowkht, Trophen Theatre – Amsterdam (Poland)
- Concert in Music Conservator Rome-Italy
- Participation in International Festival of Sufi Music in Karachi – Pakistan
- Participation in International Festival of Magham in Azerbaijan
- Concert in Headquarters of UNESCO paris – Paris
- Participation in Morgan Land Festival – Osnabruck – Germany
- Qasida Concert: Rosario La Tremendita & Mohammad Motamedi – Iran & Flamenco
- Rumi Ensemble & Mohammad Motamedi European Tour 2013
- Concert with Raz Music Ensemble (Honor of Jalāl ad-Dīn Muhammad Rūmī) at Konya, Turkey December 2015
- Qasida Concert: Rosario La Tremendita & Mohammad Motamedi at BOZAR – Brussels March 2016
- Qasida Concert: Rosario La Tremendita & Mohammad Motamedi at Cleveland Museum of Arts, Cleveland OH March 2016
- Qasida Concert: Rosario La Tremendita & Mohammad Motamedi at Zankel Hall – Carnegie Hall, New York March 2016
- Qasida Concert: Rosario La Tremendita & Mohammad Motamedi at Lisner Auditorium, Washington DC March 2016
- Qasida Concert: Rosario La Tremendita & Mohammad Motamedi at Berklee Performance Center, Boston MA March 2016
- Concert at Garonne Theater, Toulouse France April 2016
- Concert at Odeon Theater, Nîmes France April 2016

== See also ==
- List of Iranian musicians
- Music of Iran
- National Iranian Symphony Orchestra
- Persian Symphonic Music
- Hossein Alizadeh
- Kayhan Kalhor
- Mohammad Reza Lotfi
- Shahram Nazeri
- Mohammad-Reza Shajarian
