= Mandana =

Mandana may refer to

- Mandana (given name)
- Mandane of Media, 6th century BCE princess of Media
- Mandana Paintings in Rajasthan and Madhya Pradesh, India

== See also ==
- Mandhana (disambiguation)
