= Quartet Diminished =

Iranian music band

- Origin: Tehran, Iran
- Genres: Persian traditional music; Contemporary Avant-grad; Classic-Symphony; Progressive rock; Avant-jazz
- Years active: 2013 – present
- Label: Hermesrecords (Iran) Moonjune Records (USA)
- Members: Ehsan Sadigh; Mazyar Younesi; Soheil Peighambari; Rouzbeh Fadavi
- Past members: Peter Soleimanipour; Colin Bass (Guest artist in Station III); Tony Levin (Guest artist in Deerand); Markus Reuter (Guest artist in Deerand)
- Website: quartetdiminished.com

Quartet Diminished is an avant-prog musical group established in 2013 by guitarist Ehsan Sadigh. Based in Tehran and Montreal, the band blends contemporary and traditional influences, creating a distinctive style that incorporates elements of jazz, progressive rock, Persian music, and 20th-century avant-garde compositions.

== History ==
The original lineup of Quartet Diminished consisted of Ehsan Sadigh (guitar), Mazyar Younesi (piano/vocals), Peter Soleimanipour (clarinet/saxophone), and Rouzbeh Fadavi (drums). Following Soleimanipour's departure, Soheil Peighambari (woodwinds) joined the ensemble.

== Musical Style ==
Quartet Diminished’s music encompasses both structured compositions and improvisational passages. The group draws inspiration from a wide range of musical traditions, including:

- Avant-garde and contemporary jazz
- Iranian traditional rhythms and harmonics
- Ethnic ritual music
- Progressive rock
- Classical and 20th-century avant-garde music

Their work reflects a synthesis of personal and collective interpretations of modern music trends, avoiding strict adherence to any single genre.

== Discography ==
=== Station One (2012) ===
The debut album, Station One, was released by Hermes Records. It introduced Quartet Diminished's unique style, blending diverse musical elements. The album was followed by a series of performances in countries such as Austria, Hungary, Netherlands, Slovenia, Slovakia, France, Italy, and Turkey.

=== Station Two (2018) ===
The second album was recorded at Yildiz Studio in Istanbul and mixed by Manfred Eicher at La Buissonne Studio in Marseille. Initially planned for release under the ECM label, the album was ultimately published by Hermes Records due to delays in ECM’s release schedule.

=== Station Three (2021) ===
Released during the COVID-19 pandemic, Station Three continued to expand the band's audience, receiving recognition from contemporary music enthusiasts. Prominent musicians such as Calin Bass and Hossein Alizadeh praised the album for its innovative approach.

=== Deerand (2024) ===
The fourth album featured collaborations with Tony Levin (bass) and Markus Reuter (touch guitar). Released by MoonJune Records, an American label known for supporting progressive and avant-jazz music.

== Performances ==
- 2024- Moonjune Festival, Toledo, Spain
- 2024- Classical Next, Showcase, Berlin
- 2024- The “Sweet Symphony Deerand” with AISO Symphony Orchestra, Tribute to Anton Brukner, Vahdat Hall, Tehran
- 2024- Mosaic Festival, Berlin
- 2023- Tak theatre, Berlin,
- 2023- Munganga Hall, Amsterdam
- 2023-Khalij-Fars Hall, Shiraz
- 2022-Paris Le’ 3C0, Paris
- 2022- Khalij-Fars Hall, Shiraz
- 2022- Compose and Perform for AISO Symphony Orchestra Vahdat Hall (As Concerto Group, with Quartet Diminished), Tehran
- 2022- Vahdat Hall, Niavaran Hall, Roudaki Hall, ÖKF Hall, Tehran
- 2017-Vahdat Hall, Tehran
- 2017- Jazz Festival, Tehran
- 2016-AK Bank Festival, Istanbul
- 2016- Jazz in Duketown, Netherlands
- 2016- s’Hertogenbosch,- RASA, Netherlands
- 2016-Péniche Anako, Paris
- 2015- Porgy and bess, Vienna
- 2015-Club Utrecht, Netherlands
- 2015- Bologna Take5 Festival, Italy
- 2015-Jazz à la Cité, Paris
- 2015- Ferrara Pinocchio Florence, Italy
- 2015-Roudaki Hall, Tehran
- 2014- Niavaran Hall, Tehran
- 2013- Niavaran Hall, Tehran
- 2013-Porgy and bess, Vienna
- 2013-Fono club, Budapest
- 2013- KC Dunaj, Bratislava, Slovakia

== See also ==
- Music of Iran
