= Endless Vision =

Live album by Hossein Alizâdeh and Djivan Gasparyan
- Released: 3 February 2005; 14 February 2006 (US)
- Recorded: September 2003, Niavaran Palace, Tehran, Iran
- Genre: World Music, Middle Eastern music
- Label: Hermes Records; World Village records (US)
- Producer: Hossein Alizâdeh

Professional ratings
Review scores
Source	Rating
Allmusic	4/5 stars

Endless Vision is a collaborative album by Hossein Alizâdeh and Djivan Gasparyan. It was released on 3 February 2005, through Hermes Records in Iran and released on 14 February 2006 by World Village Records in the United States. It was recorded at the Niavaran Palace on Tehran in 2003.

Alizâdeh plays on this album, the six-stringed shurangiz and Gasparyan plays the Duduk.

The album was nominated for a Grammy Award for Best Traditional World Music Album at the 49th Grammy Awards.

== Track list ==
All music is composed by Hossein Alizâdeh, except where noted

No.	Title	Length
1.	"Birds" (lyrics: M. Azad)	22:20
2.	"Armenian Romances" (Shurangiz Improvisation)	3:07
3.	"Sari Galin" (Music: Ilgar Moradof with Azeri, Armenian and Persian Lyrics)	7:40
4.	"Call of the Birds" (Instrumental)	8:17
5.	"Mama" (Music & Lyrics: Djivan Gasparyan)	5:55
6.	"Improvisation on Shurangiz"	5:58
7.	"Parvaneh Sho ..." (Tasnif, Lyrics: Rumi)	7:13
Total length:		60:33

== Personnel ==
- Hossein Alizâdeh – Shurangiz
- Djivan Gasparyan – Duduk, Vocal on "Mama"

Hamavayan Ensemble

- Afsaneh Rasaei – Vocal
- Hoorshid Biabani – Vocal
- Ali Boustan – Shurangiz
- Mohammad-Reza Ebrahimi – Oud
- Ali Samadpour – Dammam, Vocal, Udu
- Behzad Mirzaee – Daf, Tombak, Naqareh

Additional Musicians

- Vazgen Markaryan – Duduk
- Armen Ghazaryan – Duduk

== Accolades ==
=== Grammy Awards ===
Year	Nominee / work	Award	Result
2006	Endless Vision	Best Traditional World Music Album	Nominated
