= Dastan Ensemble =

Dastan ensemble
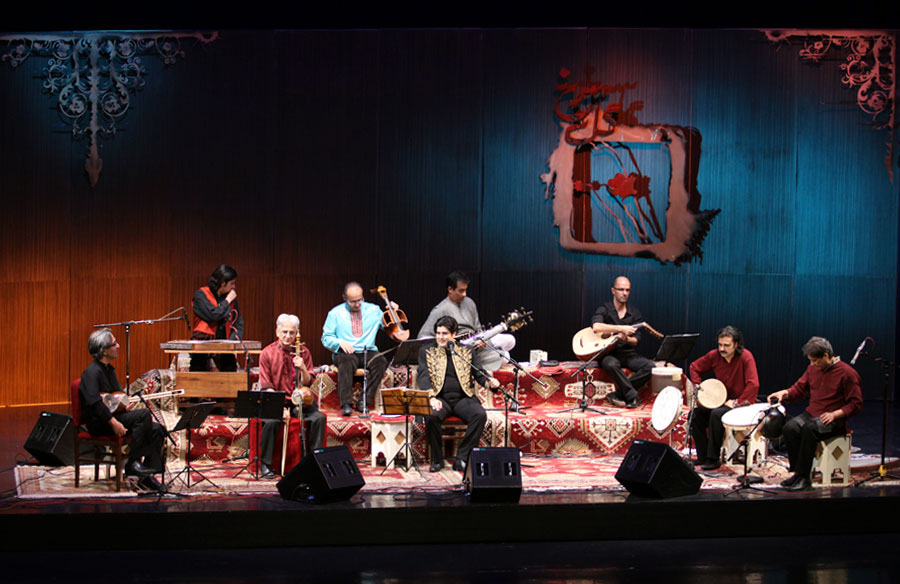
- Dastan concert - June 2011

Background information
- Origin: Iran
- Genres: Persian music
- Years active: 1991–present
- Label: Ava Sun
- Members: Hossein Behroozinia (barbat); Hamid Motebassem (Tar and Setar); Pejman Hadadi (Percussion); Saeed Farajpouri (Kamancheh); Behnam Samani (Percussion)
- Past members: Sima Bina; Salar Aghili; Shahram Nazeri; Iraj Bastami; Kayhan Kalhor; Homayoun Shajarian; Pouya Saraei

Dastan Ensemble is an Iranian classical music ensemble. Founded in 1991 by tar player Hamid Motabassem, Dastan has performed concerts throughout the world.

Hamid Motebassem founded it with musicians Morteza Ayan, Mohammad Ali Kiani Nejad, Kayhan Kalhor, and Ardeschir Kamkar.

Since 2000, the main members of Dastan include Saeed Farajpouri, Hossein Behroozi-Nia, Pejman Hadadi, and Behnam Samani.

They often collaborate with various Iranian artists in their recordings and concerts, such as Parisa, Homayoun Shadjarian, Sima Bina, Iraj Bastami, Bijan Kamkar or Shahram Nazeri.

In 2003, they received the "Prix du disque" award from the Académie Charles-Cros in the world music category for their album Shoorideh.

== Members ==
- Hossein Behroozinia (Barbat)
- Hamid Motebassem (Tar and Setar)
- Pejman Hadadi (Percussion)
- Saeed Farajpouri (Kamancheh)
- Behnam Samani (Percussion)

== Former members ==
- Sima Bina
- Shahram Nazeri
- Iraj Bastami
- Kayhan Kalhor
- Homayoun Shajarian
- Parisa
- Salar Aghili
- Pouya Saraei (Santour)
- Sadigh Tarif
- Mahdieh Mohammadkhani
- Arjang Ataollahi
