= Endangered Languages Archive =

European based digital archive for languages

Coordinates: 51.5225°N 0.1292°W

The Endangered Languages Archive (ELAR) is a digital archive for materials on endangered languages, based at Berlin-Brandenburg Academy of Sciences and Humanities (BBAW). The Archive preserves digital collections, including audio and video recordings, of endangered languages around the world. ELAR is part of the worldwide community of language archives (DELAMAN and the Open Language Archives Community). ELAR's main aim is to preserve and publish collections of audio and video recordings, transcriptions and translations, dictionaries, and primers in and of endangered languages created with and by speakers of the endangered languages. The archive also digitises legacy collections in analogue formats saving them from deterioration and making them accessible to the speaker and their descendants, scholars, and the public.

== Archive ==
The collection currently contains over 550 deposits recorded in over 70 different countries, the majority of which are the results of Endangered Languages Documentation Project (ELDP) documentation projects funded by the Arcadia Fund.

The catalogue of archived materials can be freely searched via the Open Languages Archives Community. The endangered languages collections at ELAR can be accessed free of charge.

ELAR also provides training in all aspects of the creation of digital collections to archiving collections. These entail metadata creation, data management, formats, curation as well as digitisation of analogue formats.

== Affiliations ==
The archive was originally funded in 2002 as part of a donation by the Arcadia Fund to support the documentation of endangered languages, to train students and scholars in language documentation and to digitally preserve and publish the collections. ELAR was housed in and supported by the SOAS University of London library from 2015 until their move to the BBAW in 2021. David Nathan was director during the first decade of the archive's existence until 2014, when the role was taken over by Mandana Seyfeddinipur, who is also head of ELDP.

From July, 2021, ELAR has been housed at the Berlin-Brandenburg Academy of Sciences and Humanities (German: Berlin-Brandenburgische Akademie der Wissenschaften) in Berlin, Germany.

ELAR is one of three partners of the CLARIN Knowledge Centre for Linguistic Diversity and Language Documentation (CKLD), providing its expertise to researchers and community members across Europe.
