= Hamid Motebassem =

- Hamid Motebassem playing setar

Background information
- Birth name: Hamid Motebassem
- Born: 1958 (age 66–67)
- Origin: Mashhad, Razavi Khorasan, Iran
- Genres: Persian traditional music
- Occupation(s): Composer, performer
- Instrument(s): Tar, Setar
- Website: www.motebassem.com

Hamid Motebassem (Persian: حمید متبسم) (b. 1958 Mashhad) is a classical Persian musician and tar and setar player.

His first teacher was his father. Later, he studied with musicians like Mohammad Reza Lotfi, Hossein Alizadeh and Hushang Zarif. In 1991, Motebassem founded Dastan ensemble which is one of the outstanding ensembles of contemporary Persian music.

== Works ==
- Simorq (based on Ferdowsi's Shahnameh) for voice, choire and orchestre of Persian instruments
- Zemzeme-haa [Whispers], for voice and Persian instruments
