= Arshad Tahmasbi =

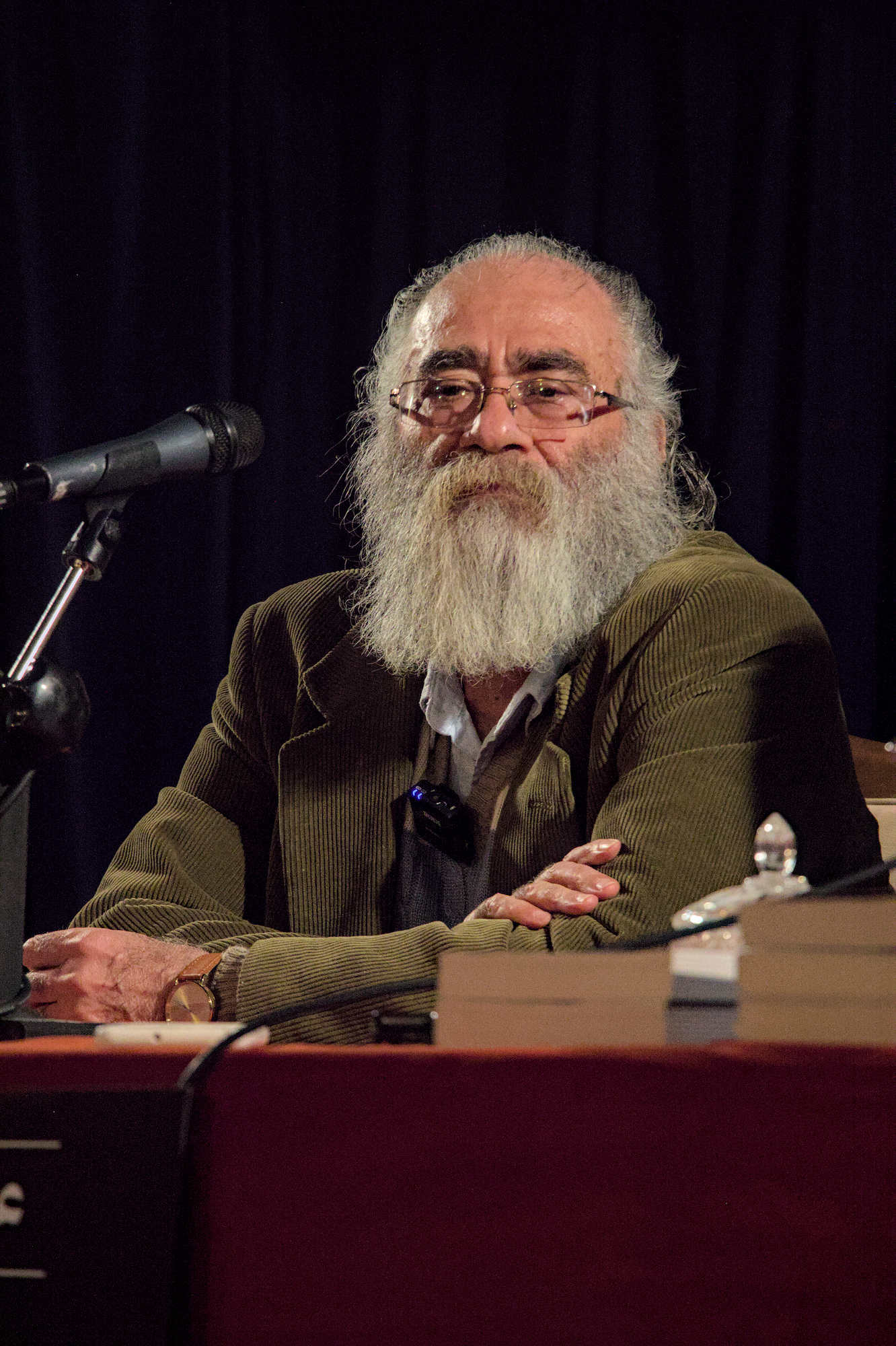

Background information
- Born: 18 January 1958 (age 68)
- Origin: Aligudarz, Iran
- Genres: Persian Traditional, Contemporary Classical
- Occupations: Composer, Tar and Setar Player
- Instruments: Tar, Setar

Arsad Tahmasbi (Persian: ارشد تهماسبی) is an Iranian musician, composer, radif-preserver, researcher, teacher, and Tar and Setar instrumentalist.

== Biography ==
Arshad Tahmasbi was born on 18 January 1958 in Aligudarz. He spent his childhood and education in Sanandaj, Hamedan and Tehran. He learned the basics of music from Mohammad Reza Lotfi and attended classes by Lotfi and Houshang Zarif at the Center for the Preservation and Dissemination of Iranian music. He entered the Faculty of Music of the University of Tehran in 1979, but was forced to leave the university a year later due to the Cultural Revolution. He became a member of Chavosh Group in 1981 and collaborated with Hossein Alizadeh, Mohammad Reza Lotfi and Parviz Meshkatian in this group. In 1981, Tahmasebi established Tar and Setar. He has had several collaborations with Hossein Alizadeh in the field of ensemble and concert performance. He has collaborated with Alizadeh on the albums Shoorangiz, Raz o Niaz, Sobhgahi, Delshodgan and Hamnavi, and has also given many concerts with Alizadeh in Europe and the United States. Arshad Tahmasbi has published books on Iranian music and has presented several cassettes and CDs in this field. His most important activity in recent years has been the creation of a center for the introduction of the tar instrument, called the "Position of the Tar". In this center, old instruments, personal belongings of Tar player masters and historical documents of Iranian music are available.

In the fifth of "Our Music Festival", which was held in December 2016, the golden statuette of the selected music album of traditional and non-verbal Iranian instrumental music was awarded to Arshad Tahmasebi for the album "Darvishkhan Works".

== Artwork ==
- The book "How Iranian Music: Exploring the Genres of Music" 2021
- "Book of Gooshe" (Culture of Iranian Songs) 2018
- "One Hundred and One Pishdaramad" 2015
- "Javabe Avaz" (based on the vocal line of Mahmoud Karimi) 2009
- "Shahroud" (Works by Arshad Tahmasebi, Aref Qazvini, Darvish Khan, Abolhassan Saba) 2007
- "Radif Mirza Abdullah according to Noor Ali Boroumand" 2006
- "Green Shadows" vocal by "Salar Aghili" 2003
- "Vocabulary weight reading" (innovative method) 2001
- "Deldar" vocal by "Mohsen Keramati" 1999
- "100 Rang Reng" (one hundred old Rengs of Iranian music masters) 1999
- "Se Chaharmezrab" 1999
- "Panje Dashti" vocal by" Mohsen Keramati " (compositions by Aref and pieces by Abolhassan Saba) 1998
- "Dashti Program" (by Musa Maroufi, revision and editing of Tahmasbi's master book) 1997
- "A collection of works by Rokanuddin Khan" (music book and album) 1997
- "Compositions of Aref Qazvini" 1996
- "Works of Darvish Khan" (music book and album) 1994
- "Hamnavaei" (with Hossein Alizadeh and Dariush Zargari) 1993
- "Love-stricken" (with Hossein Alizadeh) 1991
