= Mandhana =

Mandhana may refer to:

- Smriti Mandhana, an Indian cricketer
- Mandhana, Bhiwani, a village in the Bhiwani district of the Indian state of Haryana
- Mandhana, Kanpur, a town in the Kanpur district of the Indian state of Uttar Pradesh
- Mandhana, Mahendragarh, a village in the Mahendragarh district of the Indian state of Haryana
- Mandhana, Sirmaur, a village in the Sirmaur district of the Indian state of Himachal Pradesh

== See also ==
- Mandana (disambiguation)
