= NeyNava =

Studio album by Hossein Alizâdeh
- Released: 23 September 1983
- Recorded: 1983, Bel Studio, Iran
- Genre: Classical, Persian traditional music
- Length: 71:26
- Label: Mahoor Records; Kereshmeh Records (US)
- Producer: Hossein Alizâdeh

Hossein Alizâdeh chronology
Hesar (1977)	NeyNava (1983)	Shourangiz (1988)

Alternative cover
- NeyNava and Song of Compassion Cover

Professional ratings
Review scores
Source	Rating
Allmusic	4/5 stars

NeyNava is a studio album by Iranian musician Hossein Alizadeh, released on 23 September 1983 by Mahoor Records. In 1994 it was reissued as a double compact disc together with Song of Compassion by Kereshmeh Records in the United States. The title NeyNava combines the words "ney" (a traditional Iranian end-blown flute) and "nava" (melody), and also echoes the name of the historical city of Nineveh. The work is a concerto for ney and string orchestra and is widely regarded as one of Alizadeh’s best-known compositions. The piece blends elements of Persian classical music with formal structures characteristic of Western classical traditions, offering an example of intercultural dialogue in contemporary Iranian composition. The ney solos in the recording are performed by Jamshid Andalibi.

== Track listing ==
- Note: Two tracks are not included on The Kereshmeh Records Edition: "Riders in the Field of Hope" and "Nowruz".

Mahoor Records CD edition
No.	Title	Length
1.	"Darâmad"
2.	"Naghmeh"
3.	"Jâmeh-darân"
4.	"Nahoft, Forud"
5.	"Dance Of Samâ"
6.	"Riders in the Field of Hope"
7.	"Nowruz"
8.	"Life"
9.	"Sunrise"
10.	"Depth of Catastrophe"
11.	"Song of Compassion"
12.	"Transcendence"
13.	"Search"

US CD edition (Kereshmeh Records)
No.	Title	Length
1.	"Overture"
2.	"Variation on Naghmeh"
3.	"Jamedaran"
4.	"Nahoft and Foroud"
5.	"Sufi Dance"
6.	"Life"
7.	"Sunrise"
8.	"Depth of Catastrophe"
9.	"Song of Compassion"
10.	"Transcendence"
11.	"Search"
