= Sallaneh (lute) =

The sallaneh (Persian: سلانه) is a newly developed plucked string instrument made under the supervision of the Iranian musician Hossein Alizadeh, and constructed by Siamak Afshari. It is inspired by the ancient Persian lute called barbat. The barbat used to have three strings, but the sallaneh has six melody and six harmonic strings giving Alizadeh a new realm in lower tones.
