= Hamavayan Ensemble =

Hamāvāyān Ensemble
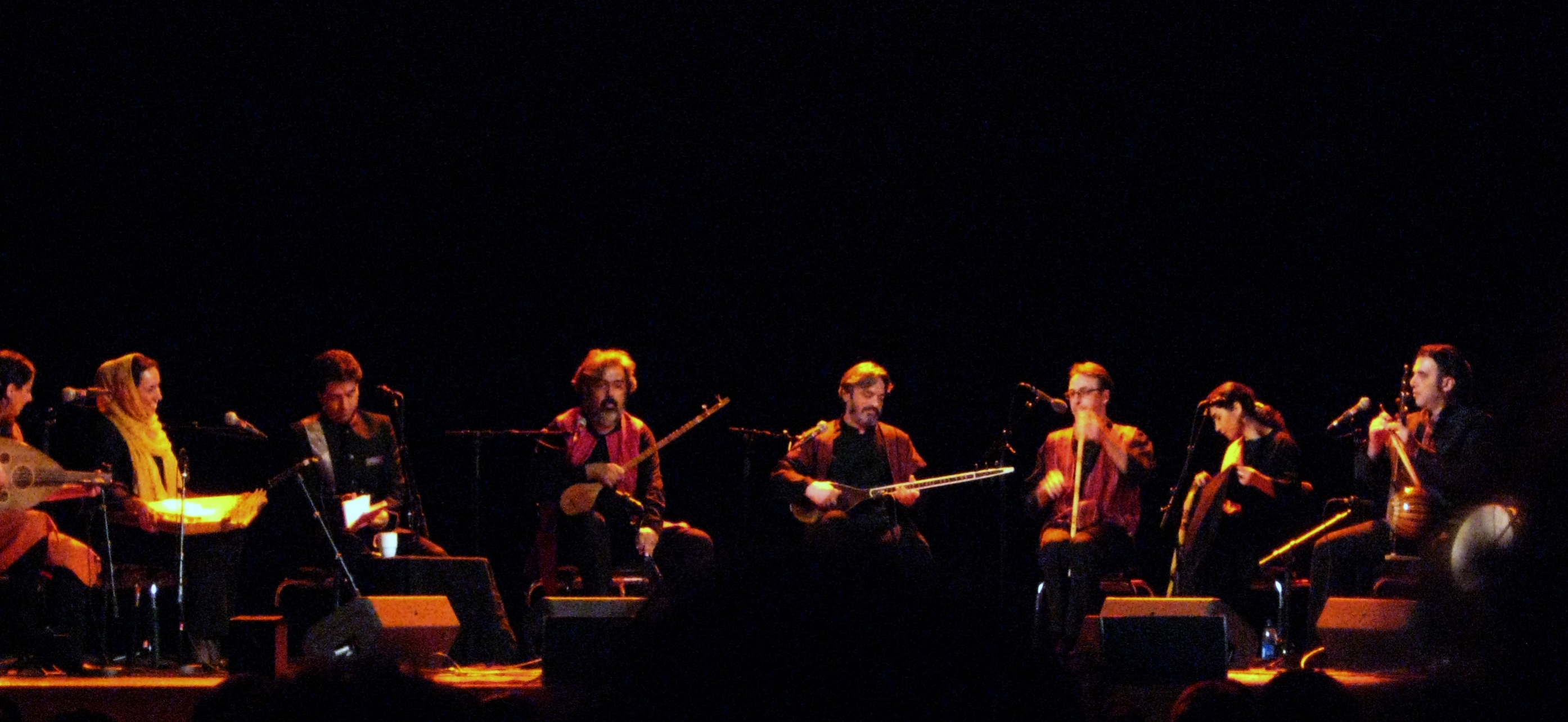
- Hamavayan Ensemble in 2013

Background information
- Origin: Iran
- Genres: Persian music
- Years active: 1989–present
- Members: Hossein Alizadeh (tar); Afsaneh Rasaei (vocal); Majid Khaladj (tombak); Ali Boustan (setar); Mohammad Motamedi (vocal); Pouria Akhavass (vocal); Nima Alizadeh (robab); Saba Alizadeh, (Kamancheh); Mohammad Enshaie,(kamancheh),(gheychak)

Hamāvāyān Ensemble (Persian: هم‌آوایان) is a Persian music group.

== History ==
Led by Iranian instrumentalist and composer Hossein Alizadeh, the Hamavayan Ensemble performs new interpretations of classical Persian music. The ensemble features male and female vocalists, tar and setar (ancient plucked lutes from Persia), and percussion.

Maestro Alizadeh's most recent recording, Endless Vision, featuring the Hamavayan Ensemble with the Armenian duduk player Djivan Gasparyan, was nominated for a Grammy.

== Members ==
- Hossein Alizadeh, tar, shourangiz (new lute)
- Mohammad Motamedi, vocal
- Afsaneh Rasaei, vocal
- Majid Khaladj, tombak
- Ali Boustan, setar
- Pouria Akhavass, vocal
- Nima Alizadeh, robab (lute)
- Saba Alizadeh, kamancheh
- Mohammad enshaie, kamancheh, gheychak

== Discography ==
- Razé No, Mahoor Institute Of Culture And Art, 1998.
- Ode To Flowers, Bâ Music Records, 2007.
- If Like Birds And Angels, I Could Fly…, Traditional Crossroads, 2010.
- Badeh Toei, Iran Concert, 2014.

== See also ==
- Music of Iran
- Masters of Persian Music
- Mastan Ensemble
- List of Iranian musicians
