= IDAGIO =

German classical music streaming service

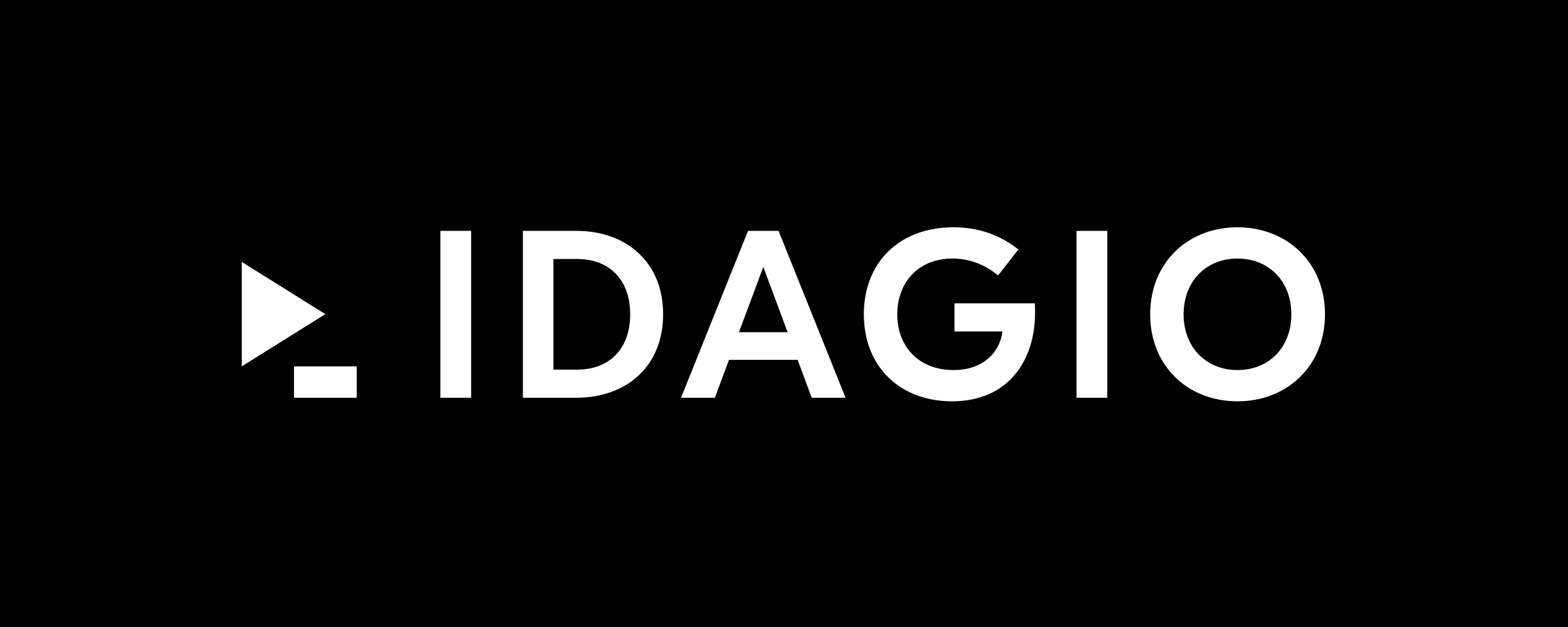
- Type: Private
- Industry: Music streaming
- Founded: 2015
- Founders: Till Janczukowicz; Christoph Lange
- Headquarters: Berlin, Germany
- Key people: Christoph Lange (CEO)
- Products: IDAGIO (classical music streaming service)
- Services: Music streaming (classical)
- Owner: Ki Soo Lee; Jim Chang
- Website: idagio.com

IDAGIO is a streaming service specializing in classical music, with both free and paid tiers. The company is based in Berlin, Germany.

== History ==
IDAGIO was founded in 2015 by Till Janczukowicz, a former artist manager, and Christoph Lange, who previously founded the German streaming company Simfy. Janczukowicz said that his aim was "to offer the ultimate streaming service for classical music worldwide. Today they offer multiple plans including : 10$ / month with 320kbps aac or 15$ / month with lossless audio." IDAGIO officially started its streaming app for iOS at the Salzburg Festival in 2015.

IDAGIO added the Sony Classical catalogue in December 2017 and the Deutsche Grammophon catalogue (comprising also the Decca, Philips and ECM labels) in January 2018. In April 2018 it announced a partnership with Warner Classics, bringing the entire Warner Classics and Erato catalogues to the platform.

In September 2018, following a €10 million funding round, the service launched in North America. Labels from the Outhere Music Group (including Alpha, Phi, Aeon and Ricercar) were added to the service in April 2019.

In November 2019, IDAGIO was named one of Time Magazine's 2019 Best Inventions.

IDAGIO faced increasing competition after Apple acquired Primephonic and launched Apple Music Classical in 2023. In mid-2025, IDAGIO entered self-administered insolvency proceedings (Eigenverwaltung) at the Charlottenburg District Court in Berlin. Business operations continued without interruption throughout the roughly four-month restructuring, which was led by managing director Erwin Stuerzer, with Sven Kirchner of the law firm Muenzel & Boehm serving as insolvency monitor. In November 2025, the company's creditors unanimously approved its insolvency plan and the court moved to lift the proceedings. Under the plan, the company was taken over by the Berlin-based music entrepreneur Ki Soo Lee, together with his business partner Jim Chang of Singapore; IDAGIO said the deal averted a threatened closure and preserved all jobs. Co-founder Till Janczukowicz was no longer involved in the business following the restructuring.

In early 2026, co-founder Christoph Lange returned to the company as CEO, succeeding Stuerzer. The company said it would focus on international expansion and broader partnerships with artists and classical music institutions, including exclusive digital content and joint membership offers with ensembles and concert organisations.

== Exclusive content ==
Several recordings have been available exclusively for streaming on IDAGIO.

In January 2020, IDAGIO reached an exclusive streaming agreement with violinist Maxim Vengerov.
