= Shurangiz =

Iranian musical instrument

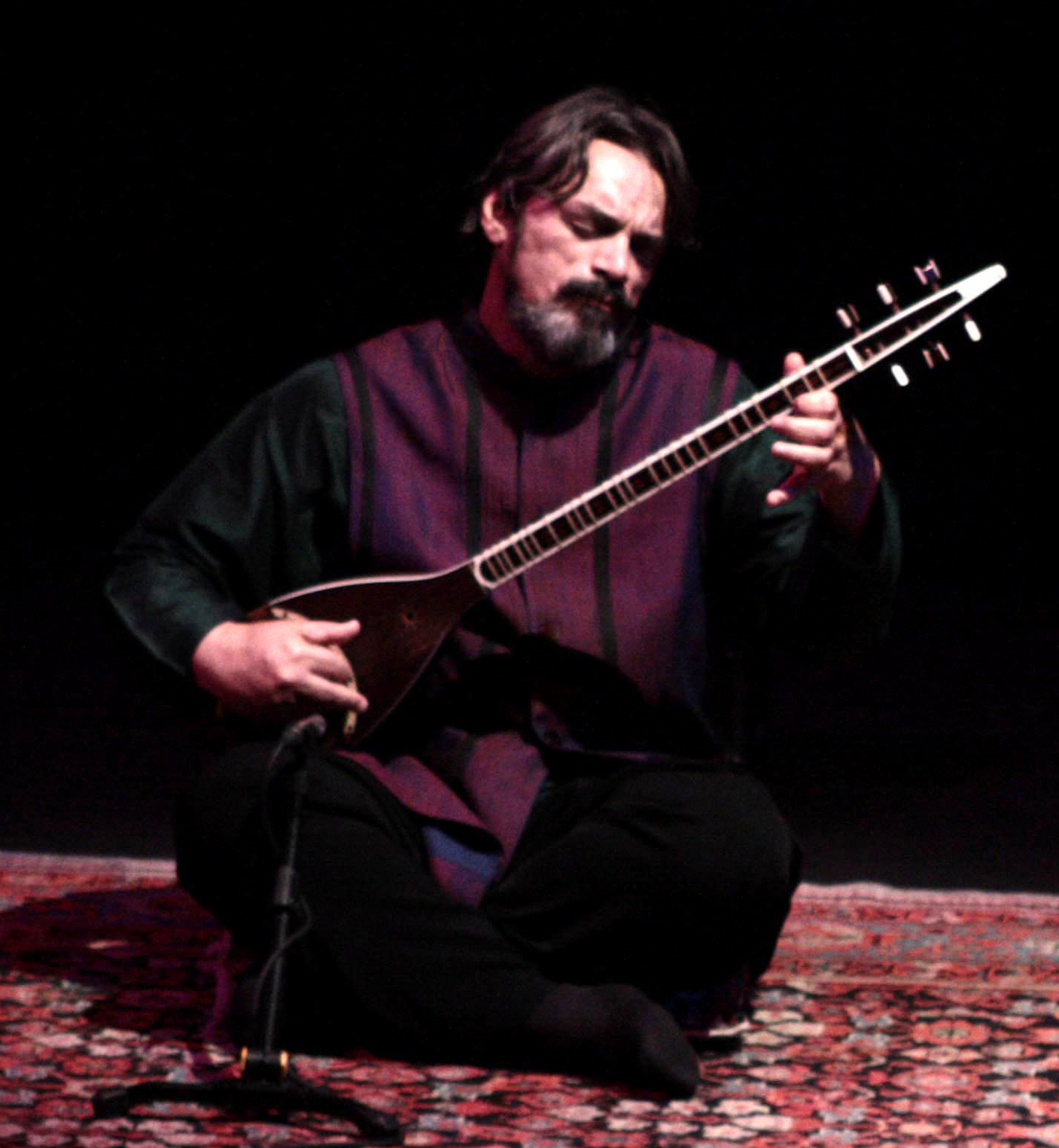
- Hossein Alizadeh playing the shurangiz

String instrument
- Other names: شورانگیز (Persian) шӯрангез (Tajik)

Related instruments
- Setar; domra; pandura; tambura; dranyen

The shurangiz (Note: /ˌʃʊəræŋˈɡɪz/ SHOOR-ang-GIZ; Persian: شورانگیز [ˌʃuːɹæŋˈɡiːz]; lit. 'exciting, stirring, tumultuous') is an Iranian musical instrument based on the setar. It was developed during the 20th century.

It differs from the setar by having skin as part of the soundboard and in the number of strings. It has a unique sound table consisting of a wooden panel suspended in the center of a membranous outer section, six strings, a longer finer fingerboard and increased number of frets comparing with its original prototype setar.

Examples made by the Mohammedi Brothers Workshop, whose luthiers trained with original designing luthier, Ibrahim Qanbari Mehr, show 23 and 28 frets, making these microtone instruments like the setar.

The shurangiz come in two different sizes. The smaller shurangiz is equivalent to the setar, with four strings (one pair placed together on a course and two individual strings). The larger bass shurangiz has six strings, set up in three courses and of times an octave lower than the setar. The skin soundboard helps add resonance and make lower notes more audible.

The shurangiz was developed by Ibrahim Qanbari Mehr with input by Iranian musician Ali Tajvidi. Masoud Shoari designed the bass shurangiz.
