= Raheleh Rahemipour =

Iranian human rights activist

Raheleh Rahemipour (Persian: راحله راحمی‌پور; born 1953) is a human rights activist from Tehran, Iran. She is best known for her campaigns to search for her forcibly disappeared family members, and for her peaceful activism for other victims of summary execution and enforced disappearance.

Since filing a complaint with the UN Working Group on Enforced Disappearances in 2016 regarding the disappearance of her relatives, Rahemipour has been accused of spreading false information and campaigning against the government, resulting in her interrogation, detention, and judicial persecution. International organizations and UN independent experts are concerned about the ongoing harassment against her and have called for this to stop.

In February 2017, Rahemipour was convicted of "spreading propaganda against the system," which resulted in a one-year prison sentence due to her media interviews, attendance at the gathering of the Mothers of Laleh Park, and signing of various petitions. She managed to avoid jail following an appeal. On August 20, 2017, Raheleh was questioned for six hours in Evin Prison about her attendance at peaceful demonstrations where she held a photo of her brother with the slogan, “You killed my brother. What did you do with his daughter?” On September 10, 2017, she was detained at her home in Tehran and transferred to Evin Prison.

As of May 2018, Rahemipour is facing trial for the second time in reprisal for a complaint filed with the UN on the enforced disappearance of her brother and his infant daughter. Ministry of Intelligence officials told Rahemipour that they would stop the prosecution if she agreed to withdraw her complaint before the United Nations.

== Enforced disappearance of brother and niece ==
Hossein Rahemipour, Raheleh’s brother, was arrested in August 1983 for affiliation with an opposition political group, the banned radical communist party Rah-e Kargar. Hossein's pregnant wife was taken with him to Evin Prison based in Teheran, where she gave birth to their baby daughter, Gilrou, in April 1984. The newborn girl was taken from her mother and never returned. The Iranian authorities refused to produce a death certificate or give further information on her death or burial circumstances. Hossein was executed in October 1984. His body has neither been returned to the family nor has a death certificate been handed over. Hossein’s family was called to collect his things a year after his death. His wife and mother of his infant daughter, who suffered from heart disease, was released in January 1985.
