= Pejman Hadadi =

Iranian musician

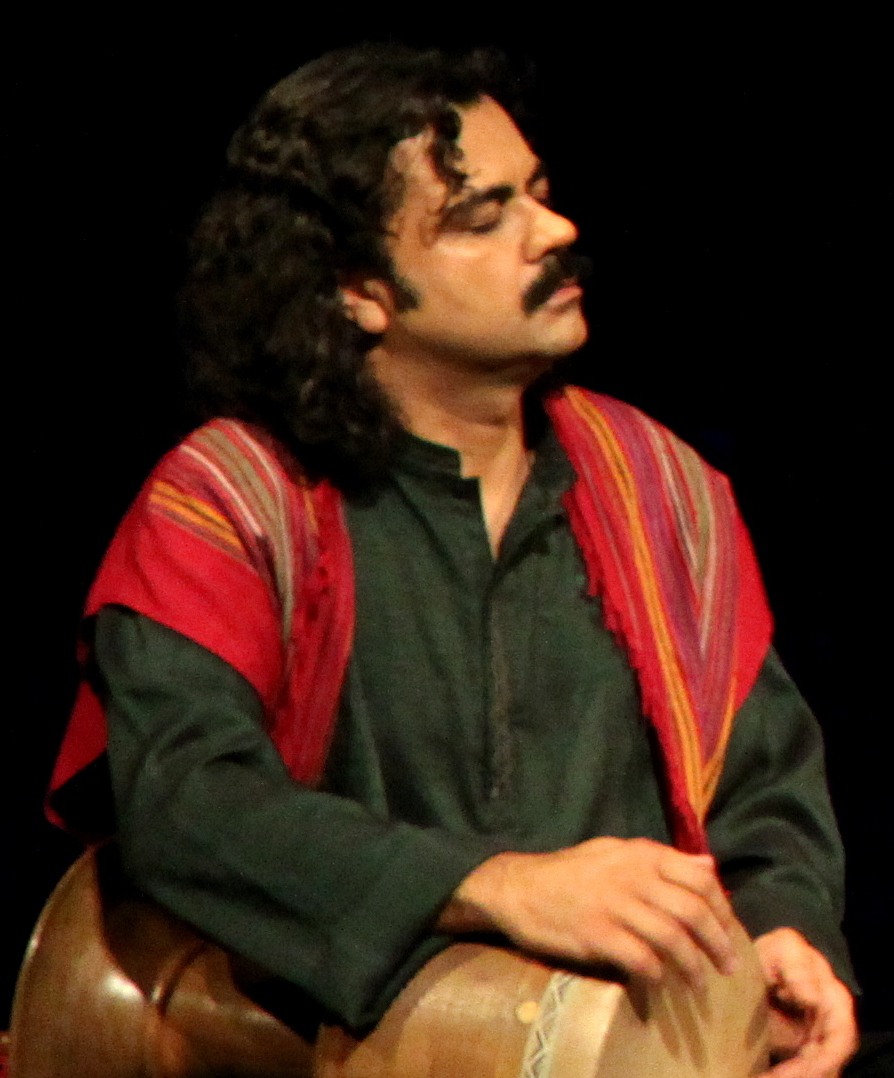
Hadadi in 2012

Pejman Hadadi (born 1969) is an Iranian tonbak player and Persian classical musician from Tehran. In 1990 Hadadi emigrated to the United States.

In 1995, he joined Dastan Ensemble.

== Awards ==
- Durfee Foundation Master Musician Award (2001)

== Recordings ==
- "Whisper" with Ali Akbar Moradi, tanbur (Kereshmeh Records, 2001)
- "Midnight Sun" with Hossein Behroozi-Nia, barbat (7/8 Productions, 2000)
- "Fire of Passion" with Ali Akbar Moradi, tanbur (7/8 Productions, 1999)
- "A Tale of Love" with Parisa & Hossein Omoumi, ney (Kereshmeh Records, 1999)
- "Through Eternity" with Dastan Ensemble (Traditional Crossroads, 1997)
- "Beyond Denial" with Axiom of Choice (X DOT 25 Music, 1994)
- "Scattering Stars Like Dust" with Kayhan Kalhor. (Traditional Crossroad 4288)
- "in sare sodaei" with Pouya Saraei
