= Mandana Seyfeddinipur =

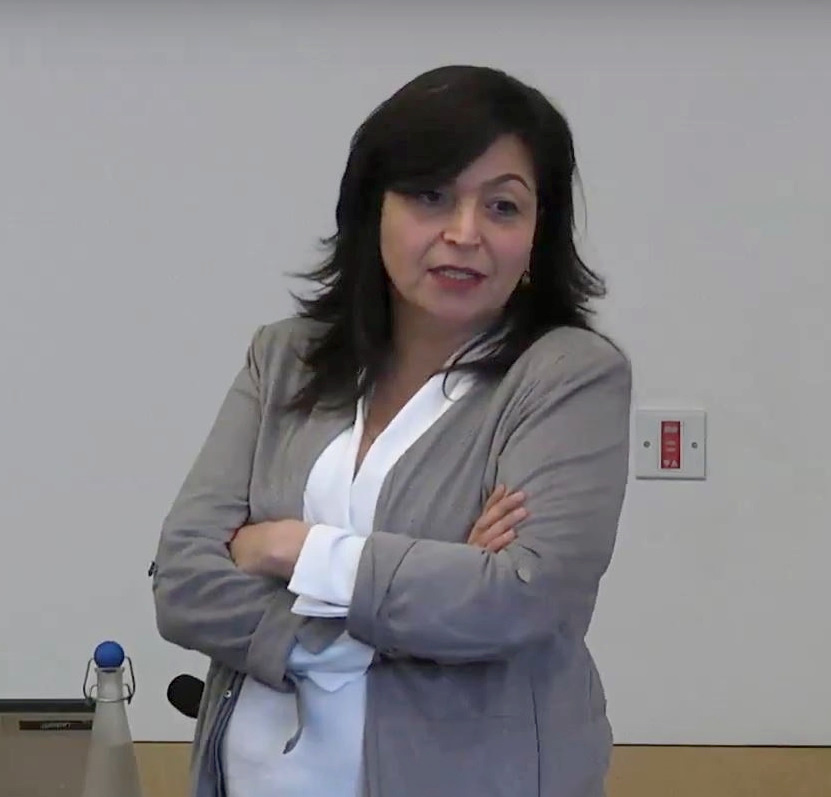
- Mandana Seyfeddinipur in 2017

Academic background
- Education: Free University of Berlin; Max Planck Institute for Psycholinguistics
- Thesis: Disfluency: Interrupting speech and gesture (2006)
- Doctoral advisor: Stephen Levinson

Academic work
- Discipline: Linguist
- Sub-discipline: Language documentation
- Institutions: SOAS University of London Berlin-Brandenburg Academy of Sciences and Humanities

Mandana Seyfeddinipur is a linguist, author, and educator. She is also the Head of the Endangered Languages Archive.

== Early life and education ==
Seyfeddinipur grew up in Germany. She studied linguistics and Persian studies at the Free University of Berlin and graduated with a Master's degree. She received her doctorate at the Max Planck Institute for Psycholinguistics at Radboud University Nijmegen from 2000 to 2005. Her dissertation was entitled Disfluency: Interrupting speech and gesture. She then worked as a Marie Curie postdoctoral work Stanford University from 2006 to 2009.

== Career ==
After another short stay at the Max Planck Institute, Seyfeddinipur moved to the School of Oriental and African Studies (SOAS) at the University of London in 2010, where she became head of the Endangered Languages Documentation Programme, which has been awarding grants for the documentation of endangered languages worldwide since 2002, financed by the private Arcadia Foundation. Since 2014 she has headed the Endangered Languages Archive (ELAR), which deals with the digital preservation of endangered languages and makes digital collections of endangered languages digitally accessible worldwide. Seyfeddinipur moved with the Endangered Languages Documentation Programme to the Berlin-Brandenburg Academy in 2021.

Seyfeddinipur teaches courses in Visual Mode of Language, the use of videos in field research on endangered languages, language psychology and language use. Her research interests focus on (audiovisual) language documentation, cultural and linguistic diversity in language use, psycholinguistics and language production. She is also involved in work on the preservation of poetry and other literature in endangered languages.

== Publications ==
=== Monographs ===
- Disfluency: Interrupting speech and gesture. Nijmegen: MPI-Series in Psycholinguistics; 2006. (PhD)

=== Articles ===
- with Dale Barr: The role of fillers in listener attributions for speaker disfluency, in: Language and Cognitive Processes, (25), pp 441–455; 2010.
- with Sotaro Kita and Peter Indefrey: How speakers interrupt themselves in managing problems in speaking: Evidence from self-repairs, in: Cognition, (108) 3, pp 837–842; 2008.
- with Sotaro Kita: Gestures and speech disfluencies, in: Proceedings of the 27th Conference of the Berkeley Linguistic Society, (BLS) Berkeley, February 2001.; 2003.
- with Sotaro Kita: Gesture as an indicator of early error detection in self-monitoring of speech, in: Proceedings of the ISCA (International Speech Communication Association) Tutorial and Research Workshop. DiSS’01:Disfluency in spontaneous speech’ University of Edinburgh, Scotland; 2001.

=== Other ===
- From gesture in conversation to visible action as utterance. Amsterdam: Benjamins; 2014. With Marianne Gullberg.
- Reasons for Documenting Gestures and Suggestions for How to Go About It. In: Nicholas Thieberger (Hrsg.), The Oxford Handbook of Linguistic Fieldwork. Oxford: Oxford University Press; 2011.
- Meta-discursive gestures from Iran: Some uses of the ‘Pistolhand’, in: Cornelia Mueller und Roland Posner (Hrsg.). The Semantics and Pragmatics of Everyday Gestures: Proceedings of the Berlin Conference April 1998. Berlin: Weidler Verlag; 2004.
- with Sotaro Kita: Gestures and repairs in speech, in: Christian Cavé, Isabelle Guaïtella und Serge Santi (Hrsg.): Oralité et Gestualité. Interactions et comportements multimodaux dans la communication. Actes du colloque ORAGE 2001. Paris: l'Harmattan, pp 266–279; 2001.
