= Afsaneh Rasaei =

Afsaneh Rasaei (Persian: افسانه رثایی) is a premier Persian vocalist who began training with Mahmoud Karimi in 1974. After the Islamic Revolution, women were not allowed to perform in public, so all the activities for women vocalists were limited to teaching. Now, Iranian women are permitted to perform at a concert with men, in the choir. However, she was the pioneer woman in Iran to sing thoroughly and singularly in concerts, even though men were present.

Born in a family of great musicians and singers, she started learning the Persian vocal Radif with Mahmoud Karimi when she was 20. In spite of restrictions for female singers in Iran, she collaborated with musicians such as Mohammadreza Shajarian and Hossein Alizadeh and was leading the Hamavayan Ensemble.

She performed several concerts in reputable concert halls such as Vahdat hall and Niavaran palace in Iran, Queen Elizbeth hall in the UK, Carnegie hall in New York City, the black diamond in Denmark and many other places in other countries.

She released multiple albums including "Endless Vision" which became a Grammy Award nominee in 2007. She has been teaching Persian vocals since 1984.
