= Soodabeh Salem =

Iranian musician

Soodabeh Salem (also Sudabeh Salam, Persian: سودابه سالم, born 1954 in Tehran, Iran) is an Iranian musician, piano player, and the conductor of Iran's Children Orchestra.

Salem succeeded in founding an orchestra to promote children's music despite numerous difficulties. Her orchestra's performance was praised in the Fajr Music Festival (2007).

She designed and taught music therapy classes for children of Bam, Iran. She has also collaborated with UNICEF for one year.

== See also ==
- Music of Iran
- List of famous Persian women
