= Saeed Farajpouri =

Saeed Farajpouri سعید فرجپوری
- Origin: kordestan, Iran
- Genres: Persian traditional music
- Occupation: Kamancheh Player
- Website: http://saeedfarajpouri.com/

Saeed Farajpouri (born 20 February 1961, in Sanandaj, Iran) is a composer, performer, and instructor of a classical Iranian instrument called the Kamancheh or Spike Fiddle.

He started learning music at age nine under Maestro Hassan Kamkar. Then he remembered the Iranian music repertoire (Radif) under Maestro Mohammad Reza Lotfi and the ensemble performance under the instruction of Maestro Hossein Alizadeh.

He has performed at several ensembles, such as Shayda, Aref, Aava, Paivar, and Dastan.

He has instructed Kamancheh at Chavosh Music Center, Music Conservatory of Tehran, and several universities and art institutes inside and outside Iran.

Saeed collaborated with Maestro Mohammad Reza Shajarian for over three decades, performing at many concerts inside and outside Iran and in albums such as Shab e Vasl, Ahang e Vafa, Rosvai e Del, Dastan, Aaram e jaan, Aaseman e Eshgh, and Del Shodegan.

He also has several solo recordings, such as:

Kamancheh Album, Segah Homayoon, and Kurdish folklore music. He has produced the following albums in Kurdish music: Awaat and Zamaneh, in memory of S. Ali Asghar Kurdestani.

In the genre of Iranian Classical music, Saeed has made the following albums:

▪ Qoqaye Eshghbazan, with Iranian instrumentalist and vocalist maestro Mohamad Reza Shajarian.

▪ Shoorideh, with the Dastan ensemble and the vocalist, Maestro Parisa. Shoorideh is a recipient of the best annual music award from the French Ministry of Education and a recipient of the Shok title from the Le Monde Music magazine.

▪ Darya e Bi Paian, with the Dastan Ensemble and the vocalist, Salar Aghili

▪ Khorshid e Arezoo, with the Dastan Ensemble and the vocalist, Homayoun Shajarian.

▪ Meykhaneh Khamoosh, with the Dastan Ensemble and the vocalist, Salar Aghili.

▪ Ahval e Del, with Hamnavazan Ensemble and the vocalist, Ms. Parisa

▪ Dami Ba Doost, with the Hamnavazan Ensemble and the vocalist, Tahereh Falahati.

▪ I Sing with you, with the Dastan Ensemble and the vocalist, Jamal Kordestani.

Saeed has written the following two books for students who specifically want to learn Kamancheh:

Twenty Pieces for Kamancheh; and

Pieces for Kamancheh

The Mahoor Institute published both books.
