= Maryam Akhondy =

Iranian singer

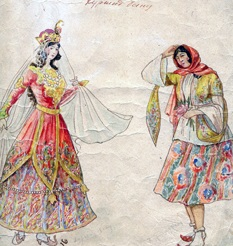
Sketches_of_Khurshid_Banu_for_Shah_Abbas_and_Khurshid_Banu_by_Azim_Azimzade in Azerbaijan State Theater Museum. Wikipedia Commons. jpg

Iranian woman and Persian musician Maryam Akhondy (born 1957) is a classical trained singer from Tehran, Iran. She was student of Ostad Esmail Mehrtasch and Ostad Nassrollah Nassehpour, two masters of classical Iranian music. Because of the difficult situation for artists, especially female artists, in Iran after the Islamic Revolution of 1979, she moved to Europe and, since 1986, has lived in Cologne, Germany.

After 1986, Maryam Akhondy started working with other Iranian musicians in exile. With Nawa and Tschakawak, two groups of traditional Iranian musicians, she performed in Germany and Scandinavia.

At the same time she founded Ensemble Barbad, a group with three to five musicians, all classically trained artists. Barbad has been touring all over Europe for the past years. Maryam Akhondy and Ensemble Barbad's newest project is called Sarmast, which means intoxicated, in this case intoxicated by the lyrics of the great Iranian poets, such as Hafez and others. Sarmast is Akhondy's own compositions in the style of classical Persian art and music. The CD Sarmast – Iranian art music for texts of Persian poets was published in 2006.

Between 1999 and 2000, Maryam Akhondy created an all-female a cappella group, Banu, because in Iran, it is difficult for female singers to appear publicly. Only for religious rituals, called ta'ziyeh, are they allowed to make music. Furthermore, for men it is forbidden to listen to the singing of women. Therefore, for Iranian women, singing is possible only in private sphere, where women are alone or among themselves: at the cradle, doing housework, working in the fields, and women's celebrations. Maryam Akhondy made it her business to bring traditional women's songs back to life again. Over the years, she has been collecting songs and published them in 2004 on her album Banu – Songs of Persian Women.

Banu, named after the Persian word for noble lady or distinguished lady, is a kind of musical expedition to the different regions and cultures of Iran. It gives an informative view of the singing culture and self-confidence of the Persian women. Most of these songs are full of life and energy, accompanied by various percussion instruments. This is quite unusual for Iranian music which is often more serene and melancholic. But these old folk songs are funny, ironic and give a view of the Iranian woman when she is in private. The women of Banu have been touring in Europe, Turkey and Tunisia until 2012.

Maryam Akhondy's creative work includes the research of old Persian music of the pre-Islamic age as well. In her musical creation "Music in Praise of Ahura Mazda" she merges traditional Iranian art music and lyrics, which has to do with the old Zoroastrian religion and philosophy. First performances had been at Musica Sacra International Festival 2012 in Füssen, Isny and Kaufbeuren (Germany).

Maryam Akhondy as a soloist has also done non-Iranian collaborations with the Schäl Sick Brass Band of Cologne between 1994 and 1999, with Mike Herting during the Ruhrtriennale in 2008, and with Bobby McFerrin in 2009.

In 2023 Maryam Akhondy received the renowned WDR Jazz Prize in the category "Music Cultures".
