= Raheleh Tahmasbi =

Iranian sea captain

- Born: Iran
- Occupation: sea captain
- Known for: First Iranian and West Asian female sea captain

Raheleh Tahmasbi is the first Iranian and West Asian female ship captain. She is also the first female seafarer of Iran after starting her career as a seafarer in 2010 at Bandar Lengeh. In 2018, Tahmasbi was selected as an influential woman in Iran.

== Life and career ==
Tahmasbi has a master's degree in computer. After earning her TFT certificate, she began teaching marine courses and later became an instructor of advanced sea survival skills. Tahmasbi started her career at sea in 2010 with a sailor certificate in the southern Iranian port city of Bandar Lengeh. She was raised to the rank of lieutenant officer after seven years. Tahmasbi was also selected as Iran's exemplary seafarer the same year. She was the first female to come to this position. In 2018, she was selected as an influential woman in Iran. In April 2023, Tahmasbi became Iran's and West Asia's first female sea captain after completing a three-month commanding course.
