= Marianne Gullberg =

Swedish psycholinguist

Marianne Gullberg is a Swedish psycholinguist specializing in second language acquisition, processing and the study of gesture.

== Education and career ==
Gullberg carried out her doctoral research at Lund University between 1993 and 1997. After short-term positions there and at Kristianstad University, she took up a postdoctoral position at the Max Planck Institute for Psycholinguistics in Nijmegen in 2000, where she was appointed Senior Research Scientist in 2003. In 2008 she became a tenured associate professor at Radboud University Nijmegen, retaining her research role at the Max Planck Institute and co-founding the Nijmegen Gesture Centre alongside Aslı Özyürek. In 2010 she was appointed Professor of Psycholinguistics and Director of the Humanities Lab at Lund University. Gullberg is a Non-resident Long-term Fellow for Programmes in Languages and Cognitive Science at the Swedish Collegium for Advanced Study in Uppsala, Sweden.

== Research ==
Gullberg is known for her research on language acquisition and gesture. Her early work reacted against the theory-driven structuralism of Swedish general linguistics at the time by seeking to investigate language use. Gullberg's research has called into question stereotypes about gesture usage across cultures, such as the idea that Italians use more gestures than speakers of other languages. In her work she has drawn on electromagnetic articulography and EEG methods alongside the traditional methods of the humanities, and aims to make a contribution to second language teaching.

== Honours and awards ==
Gullberg has been the recipient of several honours and awards. In June 2015 she was elected member of the Royal Swedish Academy of Sciences, and in March 2019 she was awarded the academy's Ann-Kersti and Carl-Hakon Swenson Prize for humanities and social science research. She was elected Member of the Academia Europaea in 2017. In 2019 she was the recipient of the Distinguished Scholar Award of the European Second Language Association, for whom she had previously served as vice-president.

== Selected publications ==
- Gullberg, Marianne. 1998. Gesture as a communication strategy in second language discourse. A study of learners of French and Swedish. Lund: Lund University Press. ISBN 9789179665081
- Gullberg, Marianne. 2006. Some reasons for studying gesture and second language acquisition (Hommage à Adam Kendon). International Review of Applied Linguistics in Language Teaching 44 (2), 103–124. doi:10.1515/IRAL.2006.004
- Gullberg, Marianne. 2006. Handling discourse: Gestures, reference tracking, and communication strategies in early L2. Language Learning 56 (1), 155–196. doi:10.1111/j.0023-8333.2006.00344.x
- Brown, Amanda and Marianne Gullberg. 2008. Bidirectional crosslinguistic influence in L1-L2 encoding of manner in speech and gesture: A study of Japanese speakers of English. Studies in Second Language Acquisition 30 (2), 225–251. doi:10.1017/S0272263108080327
- Roberts, Leah, Marianne Gullberg and Peter Indefrey. 2008. Online pronoun resolution in L2 discourse: L1 influence and general learner effects. Studies in Second Language Acquisition 30 (3), 333–357. doi:10.1017/S0272263108080480
