= Mandana Khazraei =

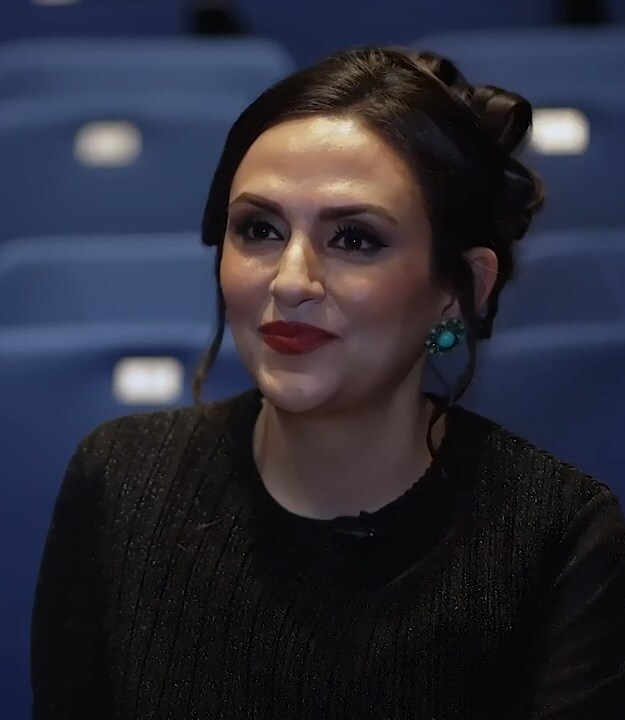

Background information
- Born: January 23, 1980 (age 45); Kerman, Iran
- Genres: Persian traditional music; Persian folk music
- Occupation(s): Singer, Poet

Mandana Khezraei (born January 23, 1980, in Kerman) is an Iranian traditional music singer and poet.

== Life ==
Mandana Khezraei was born on January 23, 1980, in Kerman. At the age of 8, she began learning the santur under the guidance of Khalil Barahani and studied vocal radif with Hengameh Akhavan and Shahnaz Moghaddam. In 2009, she emigrated to the Philippines and later to the United States, where she currently resides.

== Works ==
She, along with Moslem Alipour, performed the concert "Atr-e Khak" (Scent of Earth) in Canada, which was broadcast on BBC Persian's music program.

She has also performed in live and Nowruz shows on Voice of America (VOA) and BBC Persian. During Nowruz 2018, she performed the songs "Jahane Golha" (World of Flowers) and "Ghonche Bahar" (Spring Bud) on BBC Persian. In Nowruz 2023, she performed the song "Sar Oomad Zemestoon" (Winter Is Over) alongside Ehsan Karami on VOA's "Eide Now" (New Year) program.

=== Singles ===
- "Shabe Tanhayi" (Lonely Night) – composed by Houshang Farahani
- "Bezan Baran" (Let It Rain)
- "Be Sooye To" (Toward You)
- "Hadise Vafa" (The Tale of Loyalty)
- "Sham-e Khamoosh" (Extinguished Candle)
- "Roozegare Koodaki" (Childhood Days)
- "Mah va Sang" (The Moon and the Stone)
- "Azizam" (My Dear) – featuring Tara Piraeinde

=== Albums ===
- Shabe Tanhayi (Lonely Night)

== Activities ==
During the Woman, Life, Freedom movement, Khezraei supported Iranian protesters by participating in demonstrations abroad and releasing supportive music and videos. At one protest after the Mahsa Amini demonstrations, she stated: "The winter of 1979 will soon turn into spring."

She also criticized some male artists for their reactions to Parastoo Ahmadi's performances, saying: "For over forty years, women's voices have been silenced. Where have you been?"
