= Salar Aghili =

Classical and Persian traditional singer (born 1977)

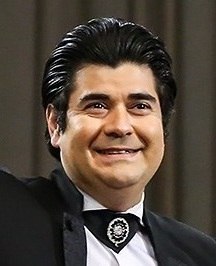
- Aghili in 2013

Background information
- Born: Mir Salar Moslemi Aghili; 2 December 1977 (age 48); Tehran, Iran
- Genres: Persian traditional music
- Occupation: Singer
- Years active: 1996–present

Salar Aghili (Persian: سالار عقیلی, romanized: Sâlâr Aqili,; born 2 December 1977), known by his full name Mir Salar Moslemi Aghili, is a classical and Persian traditional singer. (Persian: میرسالار مسلمی عقیلی, romanized: Mirsâlâr Moslemi Aqili). His spouse, Harir Shariat–Zadeh is a Persian musician who plays piano and daf.

His main teacher was Sedigh Ta'rif. Salar Aghili is the singer of Iran's National Orchestra. He has also worked with a number of Persian classical music ensembles such as Dastan Ensemble.

== Works ==
- Raghs-e Zarrat (2017)
- Saye-ha-ye Sabz (2002)
- Shahriyar (2005)
- Darya-ye Bi-payan
- Saadi-name
- Be Nam-e Gol-e Sorkh
- Maye-ye Naz
- Asheghi
- Hava-ye Aftab
- Salar-khani-ha
- Eshgh-e Dirin
- Bade-ye Noushin
- Sabou-ye Teshne
- Tabriz dar Meh
- Yar-o Diyar
- To Kisti
- Mitaravad Mahtab
- Be Sepidi-e Solh
- Yar-e Mast
- Be Yad-e Man Bash
- Naghme-ye Hamrazan
