= Hossein Alizadeh =

Iranian composer and musician (b. 1951)

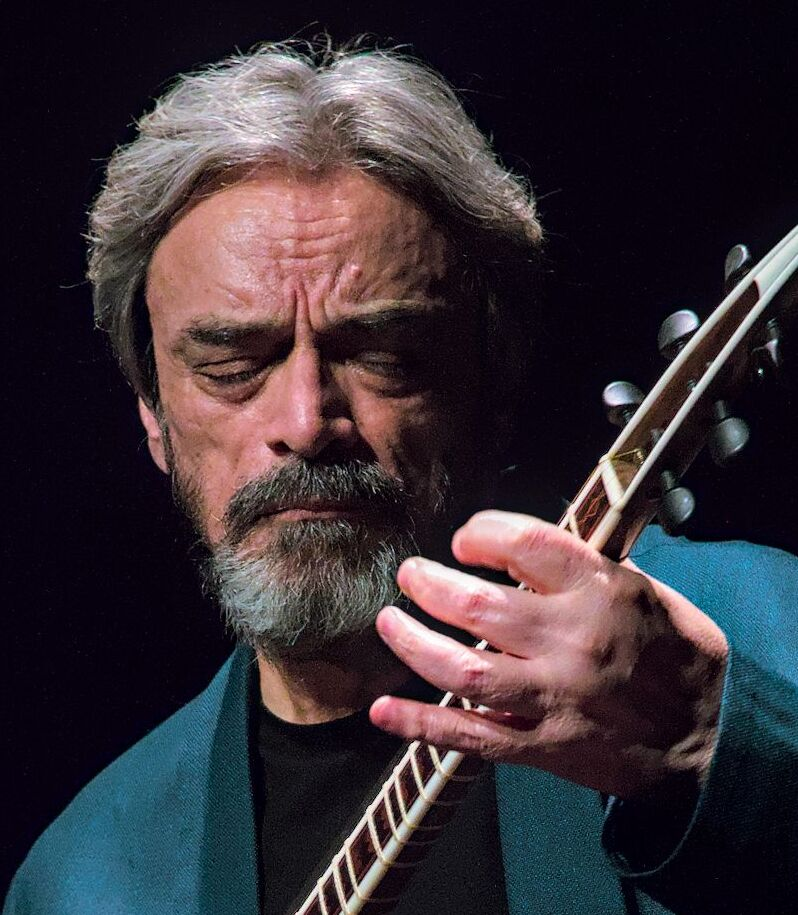
- Alizadeh in 2025

Background information
- Born: 24 August 1951 (age 75)
- Origin: Tehran, Iran
- Genres: Persian Traditional, Contemporary Classical, Soundtrack
- Occupations: Composer, Tar and Setar Player
- Instruments: Tar, Setar (also Sallaneh, Shurangiz)
- Years active: 1966

Hossein Alizadeh (Persian: حسین علیزاده; born 24 August 1951) is an Iranian musician, composer, radif preserver, researcher, educator, and a prominent performer of the tar, shurangiz and setar. Alizadeh has collaborated with numerous vocalists and instrumentalists, including Shahram Nazeri, Mohammad-Reza Shajarian, Alireza Eftekhari and Jivan Gasparyan. He has also performed with various orchestras and ensembles, both in Iran and internationally, contributing significantly to contemporary interpretations of Persian classical music.

== Music career ==
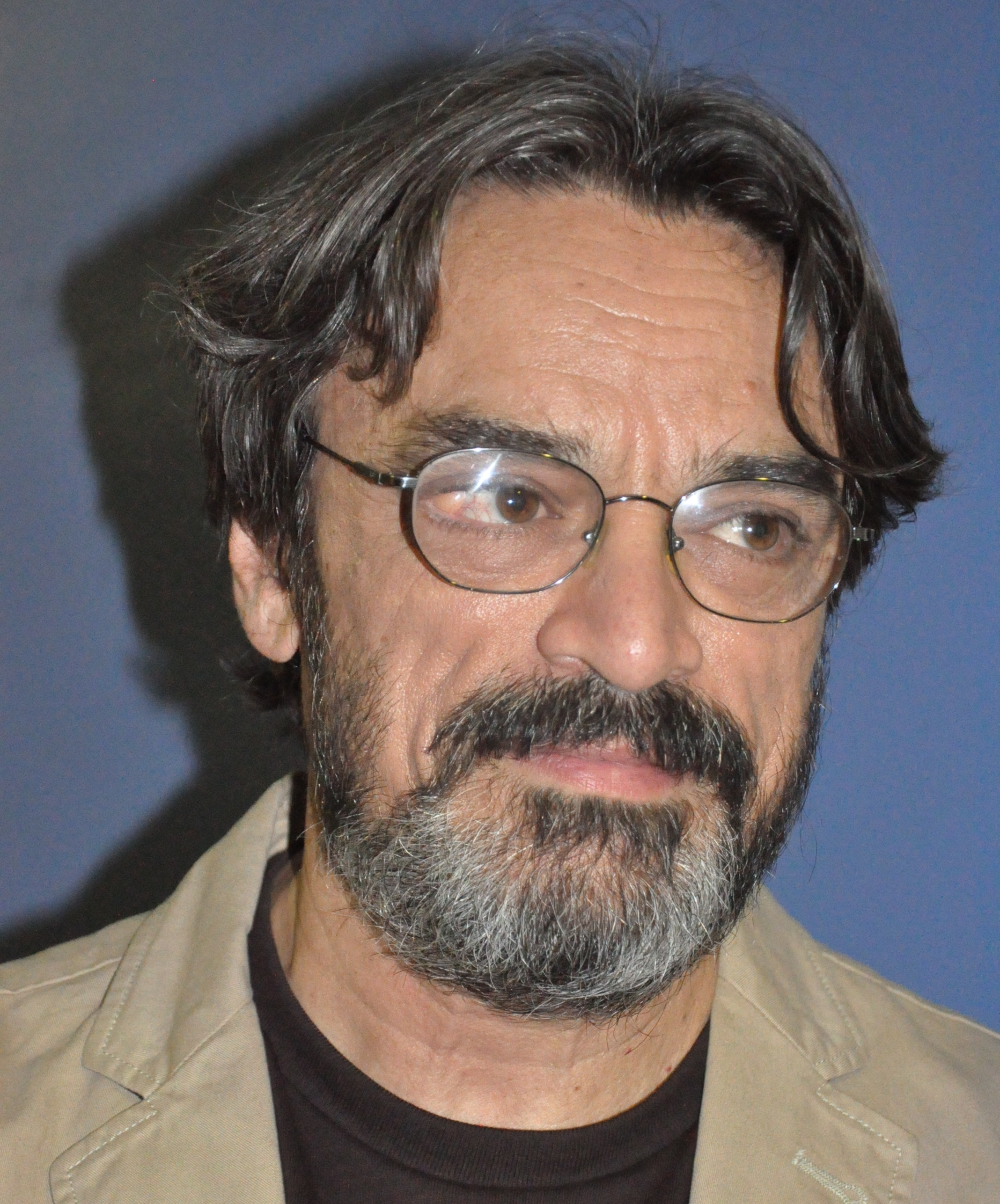
Alizadeh in 2011

Alizadeh was born in 1951 in Tehran. His father was from Urmia and his mother from Arak. As a teenager he attended secondary school at a music conservatory until 1975. His music studies continued at the University of Tehran, where his focus was composition and performance. He began postgraduate studies at the Tehran University of Art. After the Iranian Revolution, he resumed his studies at the University of Berlin, where he studied composition and musicology.

Alizadeh plays the tar and setar. He has performed with two of Iran's national orchestras, as well as with the Aref Ensemble, the Shayda Ensemble, and Masters of Persian Music. In Europe, his first professional performance was with the Bejart Ballet Company’s orchestra in a performance of a Maurice Béjart ballet called Golestan.

== Awards ==
He has been nominated for the 2007 Grammy Award along with Armenian musician, Djivan Gasparyan, for their collaboration album, The Endless Vision. In 2008, he was voted as "Iran's most distinguished musician of the year".

On 28 November 2014, he refused to accept France’s high distinction in art, Legion of Honour.

== Inventions ==
- Dad o Bidad: A new maqam in Persian music, through combining the gusheh of dad in dastgah of Mahour and the gusheh of bidad in dastgah of Homayoun.
- Sallaneh and Shoor-Angiz: Two new musical instruments derived from the ancient Persian lute barbat.

== Works ==
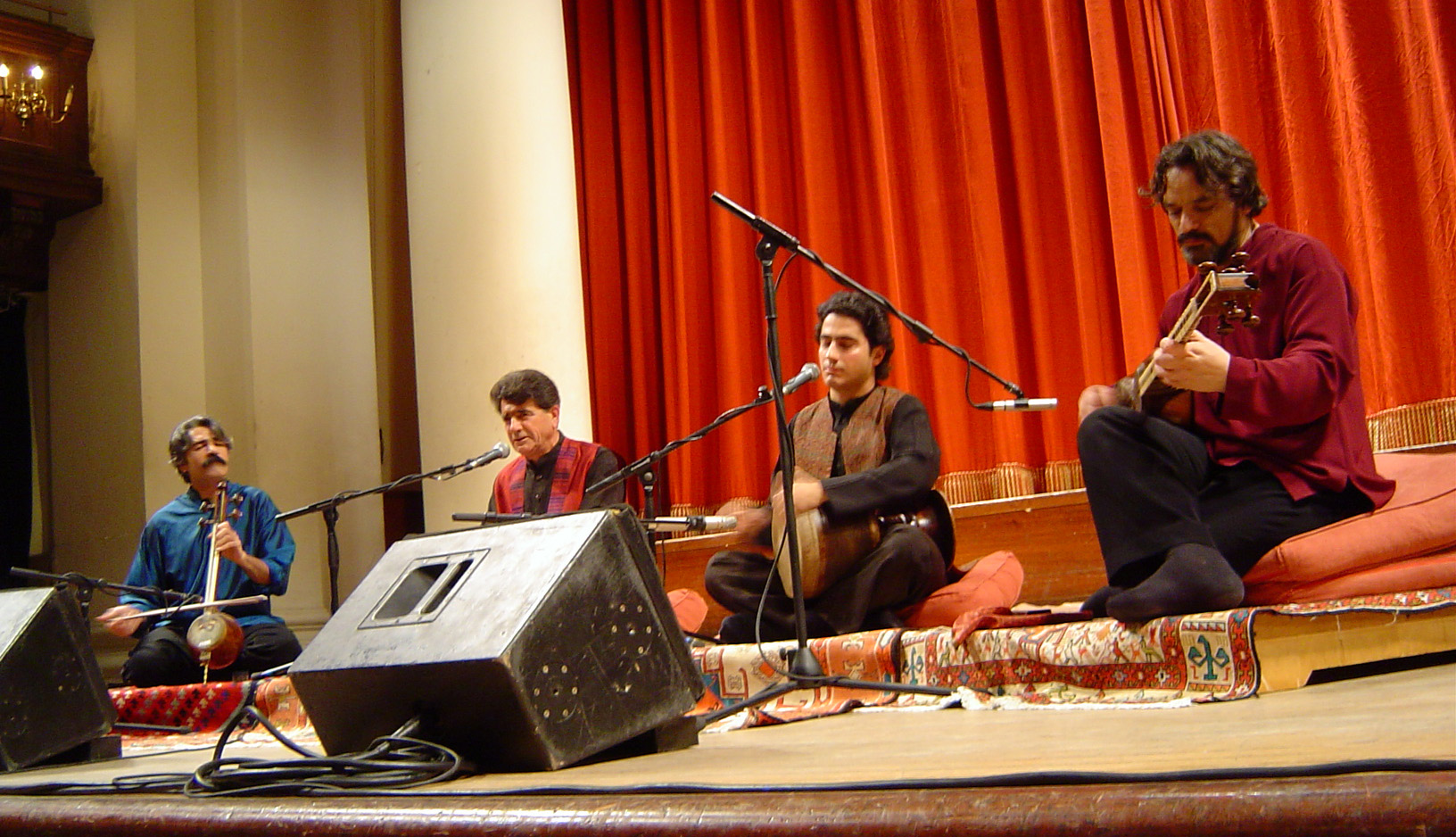
Alizadeh at a concert in London. From right to left: Alizadeh, Homayoun Shajarian, Mohammad-Reza Shajarian and Kayhan Kalhor

- 2020 – Evanesce, with Hamavayan Ensemble
- 2014 – Eşqim Gəl, with Hamavayan Ensemble (Azerbaijani language)
- 2010 – Birthplace of Earth, with Hamavayan Ensemble, Ba Music Records.
- 2009 – Half Moon, Ba Music Records.
- 2009 – Echoes of Light with Madjid Khaladj, Ba Music Records.
- 2007 – Ode To Flowers, with Hamavayan Ensemble, Ba Music Records.
- 2006 – Endless Vision, with Djivan Gasparyan
- 2005 – Birds, with Madjid Khaladj and Homa Niknam, Ba Music Records.
- 2005 – Faryad (The Cry), with MR Shajaian, Keyhan Kalhor and H Shajarian, World Village Music
- 2003 – Sallaneh, Mahoor Institute
- 2002 – Bi To Be Sar Nemishavad (Without You), MR Shajarian, Keyhan Kalhor and Homayoun Shajarian, World Village Music
- 2001 – Chahargah & Bayat-e Tork with Hossein Omumi, M Ghavihelm, Mahoor Institute
- 2000 – Zemestan ast (It's Winter), Mehdi Akhavan Sales: Poems MR Shajaian: Vocals Hossein Alizadeh: Tar Keyhan Kalhor: Kamancheh H Shajarian: Vocals & tombak Soroush Co.
- 1999 – Raz-e No (Novel Mystery), Hossein Alizadeh: Composer, Tar, Tanbur Mohsen Keramati, Afsaneh Rasayi, Homa Niknam, Ali Samadpour: Vocals Daryush Zargari: Tombak Mahoor Institute
- Paria, Qesseh-ye Dokhtara-ye Nane Darya (Paria, Tale of Daughters of the Mother Sea)
- 1996 – Sobhgahi Hossein Alizadeh: Composer Mohsen Karamati: Vocals Mahoor Institute
- 1995 – Musique iranienne: improvisations (کنسرت بداهه نوازی: نوا و همایون): H. Alizadeh: tar & setar; Madjid Khaladj: tombak, Buda Records
- 1994 - Paykubi Hossein Alizadeh: Setar Daryush Zargari: Tombak Mahoor Institute
- 1993 – Hamnavaei Hossein Alizadeh: Tar Arshad Tahmasbi: Tar Dariush Zargari: Tombak Mahoor Institute
- 1991 – Ava-ye Mehr (Song of Campassion), Hossein Alizadeh: Composer Orchestra of Indigenous Instruments of Iran
- 1990 – No Bang-e Kohan (Ancient Call-Anew) Mahoor Institute
- 1988 – Shourangiz (Song of Campassion), Hossein Alizadeh: Composer Sheyda and Aref Groups Shahram Nazeri: Vocals Mahoor Institute
- 1989 – Torkaman, Hossein Alizadeh: Setar Mahoor Institute
- 1988 – Raz-o-Niaz, Hossein Alizadeh: Composer Sheyda and Aref Groups Alireza Eftekhari: Vocals Mahoor Institute
- 1986 –Dream
- 1983 – NeyNava, Hossein Alizadeh: Composer String Orchestra of the National Radio and Television of Iran Djamshid Andalibi: Ney Soloist
- 1983 – Osyan (Revolt)
- 1977 – Hesar
- 1977 – Savaran-e Dasht-e Omid (Riders of the Plain of Hope)

== Film scores ==
- Taboo, 2015
- The Song of Sparrows, 2008.
- Half Moon, 2006.
- Turtles can fly, 2004.
- Abjad ("First Letter"), 2003, composed by Abolfazl Jalili.
- Zamani baraye masti asbha ("A Time for Drunken Horses"), 2000.
- Doxtaran e xorshid ('Daughters of the Sun") directed by Maryam Shahriya, 2000.
- Gabbeh, 1995.
- Del Shodegan directed by Ali Hatami, 1992.
- Az A'sar, ("From Eons Ago")
