= Jan-e Oshagh =

Studio album by MohammadReza Shajarian
- Released: 1995
- Genre: Persian traditional music, classical music
- Length: 56:55
- Language: Persian

MohammadReza Shajarian chronology
Gonbad-e Mina (1994)	Jan-e Oshagh (1995)	Peygham-e Ahl-e Del (1995)

Jan-e Oshagh (Persian: جان عشاق) is a Persian traditional music album performed by Mohammad Reza Shajarian with the collaboration of Parviz Meshkatian, Dariush Pirniakan, Javad Maroufi, and Mohammad Reza Darvishi. The album was recorded in 1985 and released in 1995 by Del Avaz Company. The lyrics are drawn from Hafez's poems and Baba Tahir's Do-baytīs, emphasizing the depth of Persian classical poetry.

The album consists of 10 tracks, three of which are instrumental. The remaining tracks feature vocal performances set to the poetry of Hafez and Baba Tahir. The pieces are composed in the traditional musical modes of Avaz-e Dashti and Bayat-e Esfahan.

Shajarian's two children, Homayoun and Mojgan Shajarian, contributed to the album's mastering and graphic design. Mohammad Reza Darvishi arranged the musical pieces, further enhancing the album's artistic cohesion.

== Personnel ==
- Composer: Parviz Meshkatian
- Musicians: Parviz Meshkatian, Mohammad Reza Darvishi and Javad Maroufi
- Music arranger: Mohammad Reza Darvishi
- Songwriters: Hafez Shirazi and Babataher
- Singer: Mohammad Reza Shajarian

== Track listing ==
Standard edition
No.	Title	Writer(s)	composed by	Length
1.	"Pish Daramade Dashti"	Hafez	Parviz Meshkatian	3:46
2.	"Avaz Va Santour"	Hafez		6:57
3.	"Edameye Saz o Avaz"	Hafez		7:51
4.	"Tasnife Gonbade Mina"	Hafez		11:02
5.	"Pish Daramade Bayate Esfahan"	Hafez		2:36
6.	"Charmezrabe Taknavaziye Piano"	Hafez		2:11
7.	"Avaz Va Piano"	Hafez		4:27
8.	"Edameye Saz o Avaz"	Hafez		6:37
9.	"Edameye Saz o Avaz"	Baba Tahir		2:33
10.	"Tasnife Jane Oshagh"	Hafez		8:55
Total length:				56:55
