= Dariush Pirniakan =

Daryoush Pirniakan
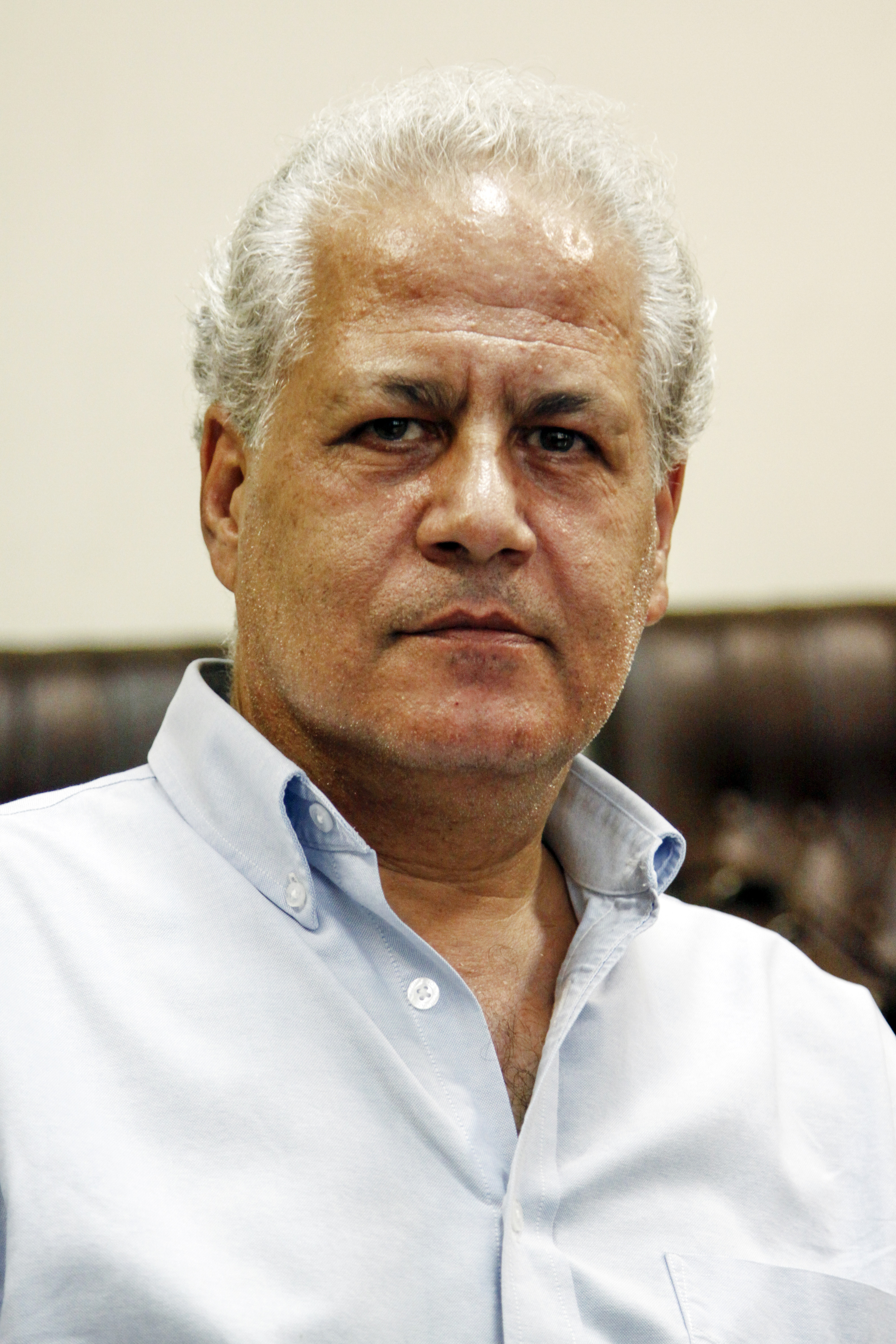
- Daryoush Pirniakan playing tar

Background information
- Born: Daryoush Pirniakan; 1955 (age 70–71)
- Origin: Hadishahr, Iran
- Genres: Persian traditional music
- Occupations: Composer, performer
- Instruments: Tar, Setar
- Website: www.daryoushpirniakan.com

Daryoush Pirniakan (Persian: داریوش پیرنیاکان) (b. 1955 in East Azerbaijan) is an Iranian musician, tar and setar player, and music researcher.

== Biography ==
Daryoush Pirniakan, a musician and composer of Persian classical genre, learned tar and setar under the supervision of Mohammad Hasan Ozari, maestro Ali-Akbar Shahnazi, Dr. Daryoush Safvat, Yousef Foroutan, Saeed Hormozi, and Mahmoud Karimi. While being a student of late maestro Ali Akbar khan Shahnazi, he had the honor to study radif of Mirza Hossein-gholi (Persian: میرزا حسینقلی) and Shahnazi's advanced level repertoire (radif).

After graduating from the Faculty of Fine Arts in Tehran University (دانشگاه تهران), he started to work and teach at the Center for Preservation and Propagation of Persian Classical Music. He has had long-term collaboration with Grammy Award nominee, maestro Mohammad Reza Shajarian since 1979. This collaboration led to more than 220 concerts in Iran, USA, Canada, Great Britain, France, Germany, Switzerland, Sweden, Norway, Denmark, Netherlands, Italy, and UAE. He also had been one of the members of Aref Ensemble, directed by late maestro Parviz Meshkatian.

He has been a music professor at Tehran University, the deputy chairman of Faculty of Dramatic Arts in Tehran University, as well as spokesman of Iran Music House. As the founder of Shahnazi Ensemble, he has also had several collaborations with Hamid Reza Nourbakhsh as singer.

== Awards and Recognitions ==
- A first degree art medal by the Ministry of Culture and Islamic Guidance (2001)
- Honorary doctorate from the Ministry of Science, Research and Technology (2004).

== Discography ==
- "Aseman-e Eshqh", on Tar, accompanying Mohammad Reza Shajarian
- "Sarv-e Chaman", on Setar, accompanying Mohammad Reza Shajarian
- "Payam-e Nasim", on Tar, accompanying Mohammad Reza Shajarian
- "Del-e Majnoon", on Setar, accompanying Mohammad Reza Shajarian
- "Yad-e Ayyam", on Tar, accompanying Mohammad Reza Shajarian
- "Rosva-ye Del", on Tar, accompanying Mohammad Reza Shajarian
- "Aram-e Jan", on Tar, accompanying Mohammad Reza Shajarian
- "Jan-e Oshshagh", on Tar, accompanying Mohammad Reza Shajarian
- "Mahour and Segah", on Tar (dedicated to the memory of Ostad Shahnazi)
- "Shur Dasht", on Tar, accompanying Sadiq Tarif
- "Sokhan-e Tazeh", accompanying Shahram Nazeri
- "Aseman", accompanying Hamid Reza Nourbakhsh and Shahnazi Ensemble
