= Reza Ghassemi =

Iranian novelist and musician (born 1949)

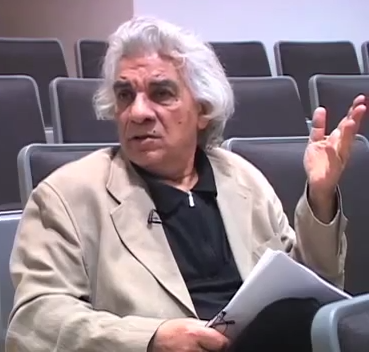

Background information
- Born: 1949 (age 76–77); Isfahan, Imperial State of Iran
- Occupations: Musician, novelist
- Instrument: Setar
- Website: rezaghassemi.com

Reza Ghassemi (Persian: رضا قاسمی; born 1949) is an Iranian novelist, composer, and setar player. He was born in Isfahan, and was active in Iranian classical music in the 1970s and 1980s. He composed pieces performed by Shahram Nazeri and worked with musicians such as Mohammad Reza Shajarian. After moving to France in 1986, he founded Moshtaq Ensemble in Paris and later began a parallel literary career. He has written three novels in Persian, one of which is The Spell Chanted by Lambs (2002), which won the Hooshang Golshiri Literary Award. He also co-wrote and co-directed the 2019 film In Full Bloom.

== Life and career ==
Reza Ghassemi was born in 1949 in Isfahan, Iran. In addition to his literary career, he has made contributions to Iranian classical music, specializing in the setar, a traditional Persian lute. He has composed music for vocalist Shahram Nazeri and has collaborated with other prominent artists, including Mohammad Reza Shajarian and Sepideh Raissadat.

His compositions are featured on Shahram Nazeri’s 1984 album Gol-e Sadbarg, considered an influential recording in Persian classical music. The album also includes pieces by Jalal Zolfonoun, Shahram Nazeri, and Reza Ghassemi himself.

In 1986 Ghassemi moved to Paris, where he founded the Moshtaq Ensemble and began teaching setar and Persian classical repertoire.

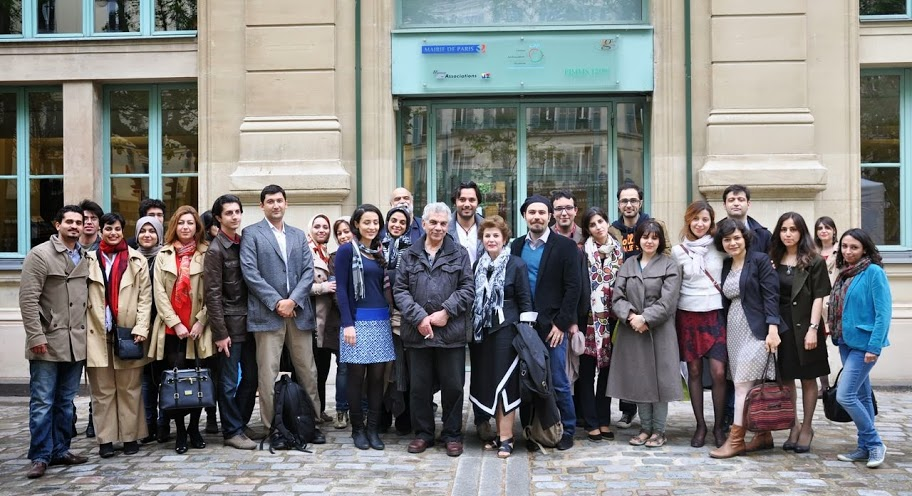
Membres de l'Association Bahar avec Reza Ghassemi

The album 14 Cheerful Pieces, performed with vocalist Sepideh Raissadat and labeled under the Moshtaq Ensemble, was released on 25 October 2010, by French label Buda Musique.

Ghassemi has authored at least three novels. His debut, Nocturnal Orchestra of Woods (1996), garnered critical attention; others include The Well of Babel (1999) and The Spell Chanted by Lambs (2002), which was originally serialized online and became his first novel to be published in English.

Ghassemi was a co-writer and co-director of the 2019 film In Full Bloom.

== Awards ==
- 2002 Hooshang Golshiri Literary Award, Best First Novel, The Nocturnal Harmony
- 2002 The Writers and Critical Award
- 2002 PEKA Award
- 2010 The Writers and Critical Award

== Albums ==
- 14 Cheerful Pieces (Oct. 2010)
- Dashti-Mahur (1992)
- Improvisation in Esfahan – Rast Panjgah
- Siavash Khani (Chahargah)
- Gol-e Sadbarg (1984)

== Publications ==
- Nocturnal Orchestra of Woods (1996)
- The Well of Babel (1999)
- The Spell Chanted by Lambs (2002)

== See also ==
- List of Iranian writers
- List of Iranian musicians
