= Rabbana =

1979 single by Mohammad-Reza Shajarian

- «ربَّنا»* (Arabic)
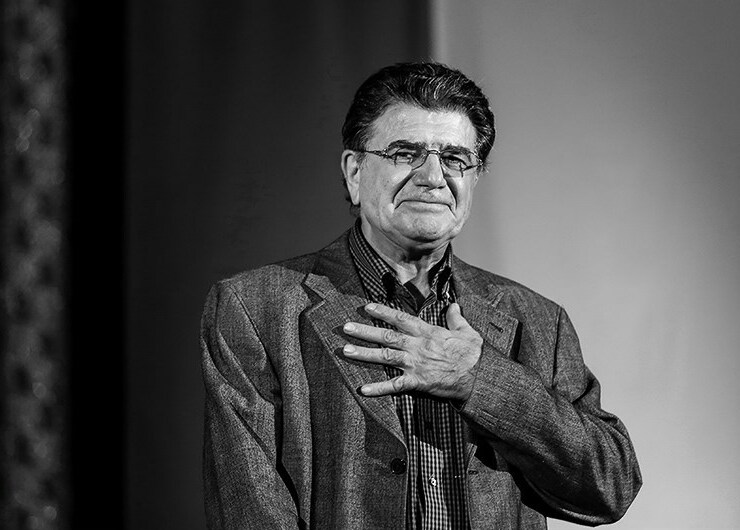
- Mohammad-Reza Shajarian
- Artist: Mohammad-Reza Shajarian
- Year: July 1979
- Type: Supplication Religious music in Iran
- Medium: Segāh modal system Maqām Rast
- Website: https://rabanaa.ir/

"Rabbana", or "Shajarian's Rabbana", is one of the revered works of Mohammad-Reza Shajarian, consisting of four supplications taken from the Qur'an. It is performed in the Segāh modal system, and each supplication begins with the phrase Rabbana (Our Lord).

The piece was recorded in July 1979, and for 30 years it was one of the main broadcasts of Islamic Republic of Iran Broadcasting during the Islamic month of Ramadan. In May 2017, the piece was inscribed as a piece of Iran's intangible cultural heritage, with the registration number 1396.

According to Shajarian, because people had long been accustomed to hearing Seyyed Javad Zabihi’s rendition of the supplication Rabbana at iftar time, he composed a new version by adding two more Qur’anic verses and recorded it at a Radio Iran studio. His main motivation was to teach the piece to students who were to recite supplications on national television before iftar.

Mohammad-Reza Shajarian performed this supplication as a training version for his students to practice, unaware of its potential to rise to popularity.

== Composition ==
In 1979, transformations were underway in the music department of the Islamic Republic of Iran Broadcasting (IRIB), and the management was considering halting music production. During this time, Shajarian advocated for retaining talented staff in the music department.

The leader of IRIB asked Shajarian to create a new piece suitable for broadcast before iftar in light of the political and religious shifts in Iran. Shajarian initially declined, saying he had been away from such content for years, but the director insisted: "Only you can do this—we have no one else." At that time, Shajarian had transferred from the Ministry of Agriculture to IRIB and was formally a National Iranian Radio and Television employee. He agreed and in the summer of 1979, started a training course for students who were to recite Dua al-Sahar and supplications. Soon after, he began recording the pieces.

== Form ==
Shajarian performed the piece in the Segah dastgah (musical modal system of Persian classical music). Throughout the piece, the melody modulates into other dastgāhs and āvāzes of the Persian radif tradition, including Āvāz-e Afshāri, but ultimately returns to Segāh.

Rabbana was released as part of Shajarian’s album “Be Yād-e Pedar” (In Memory of Father).

This rendition is nearly devoid of vocal ornaments known as tahrir (a traditional trill-like technique) and, aside from a few pitches, is primarily performed using glissando and vibrato techniques. It begins with tones around B♭ and ascends to C, staying largely within this range (on a G-clef staff), and reaches its peak note at E♭.

== Dua ==
Arabic	Transliteration	English Translation
رَبَّنَا لَا تُزِغْ قُلُوبَنَا بَعْدَ إِذْ هَدَيْتَنَا وَهَبْ لَنَا مِن لَّدُنكَ رَحْمَةً ۚ إِنَّكَ أَنتَ الْوَهَّابُ Al-Imran, verse 8	Rabbana lā tuzigh qulūbanā baʿda idh hadaytanā wa-hab lanā min ladunka raḥmatan innaka anta al-Wahhāb	O our Lord, do not let our hearts deviate after You have guided us. Grant us mercy from Yourself—surely You are the Giver of gifts.
إِنَّهُ كَانَ فَرِيقٌ مِّنْ عِبَادِي يَقُولُونَ رَبَّنَا آمَنَّا فَاغْفِرْ لَنَا وَارْحَمْنَا وَأَنتَ خَيْرُ الرَّاحِمِينَ Al-Mu'minun, verse 109	Innahu kāna farīqun min ʿibādī yaqūlūna rabbana āmannā fa-ghfir lanā wa-rḥamnā wa-anta khayru al-rāḥimīn	Surely, a group of My servants would say: “Our Lord, we have believed, so forgive us and have mercy on us. You are the best of the merciful.”
إِذْ أَوَى الْفِتْيَةُ إِلَى الْكَهْفِ فَقَالُوا رَبَّنَا آتِنَا مِن لَّدُنكَ رَحْمَةً وَهَيِّئْ لَنَا مِنْ أَمْرِنَا رَشَدًا Kahf, verse 10	Idh awā al-fitiyatu ilā al-kahf fa-qālū rabbana ātinā min ladunka raḥmatan wa-hayyiʾ lanā min amrinā rashadā	When the youths took refuge in the cave, they said: “Our Lord, grant us mercy from Yourself and guide us rightly in our affairs.”
وَلَمَّا بَرَزُوا لِجَالُوتَ وَجُنُودِهِ قَالُوا رَبَّنَا أَفْرِغْ عَلَيْنَا صَبْرًا وَثَبِّتْ أَقْدَامَنَا وَانصُرْنَا عَلَى الْقَوْمِ الْكَافِرِينَ Surah Al-Baqara, verse 250	Wa-lammā barazū li-Jālūt wa-junūdihi qālū rabbana afriġ ʿalaynā ṣabran wa-thabbit aqdāmanā wa-nṣurnā ʿalā al-qawmi al-kāfirīn	When they faced Goliath and his troops, they prayed: “Our Lord, pour out patience upon us, make our steps firm, and help us against the disbelieving people.”

== Reception ==
- Mustafa Ghalwash, a renowned Egyptian qāriʾ, heard Shajarian’s Rabbana during his trip to Iran. He initially kept a copy of it for inspiration but later remarked that reciting it is not within the ability of just any singer.
- Hushang Ebtehaj, an Iranian poet, regarded Rabbana as both an unearthly work and “Shajarian’s great masterpiece,” saying that no one—not even Shajarian himself—could perform it the same way again.
- Shahram Nazeri, an Iranian singer and musician, stated that from a performance standpoint Rabbana is unmatched. He then expressed his long-held wish that it had been delivered with a more distinctly Iranian tone and style, believing it could have deeply influenced the expressive traditions of future generations of Iranian vocalists.
- Gholam Kuwaitipour, a religious vocalist, stated: “If you recite God’s word with love and listen to it with love, your body cannot help but tremble. I don’t recall ever hearing Shajarian’s *Rabbana* without being overwhelmed. Like many of his other works, Rabbana is immortal and part of our cultural and artistic heritage.”
- Ali Khamenei: “...those ‘Rabbana’ recitations sung by Shajarian and aired before maghrib during Ramadan are artistic productions; they are not spiritually-charged pieces. It is not appropriate to broadcast something like that after the adhan. I believe the ordinary, local voice from the mosque is more suitable and fitting after the adhan.”

== Related works ==
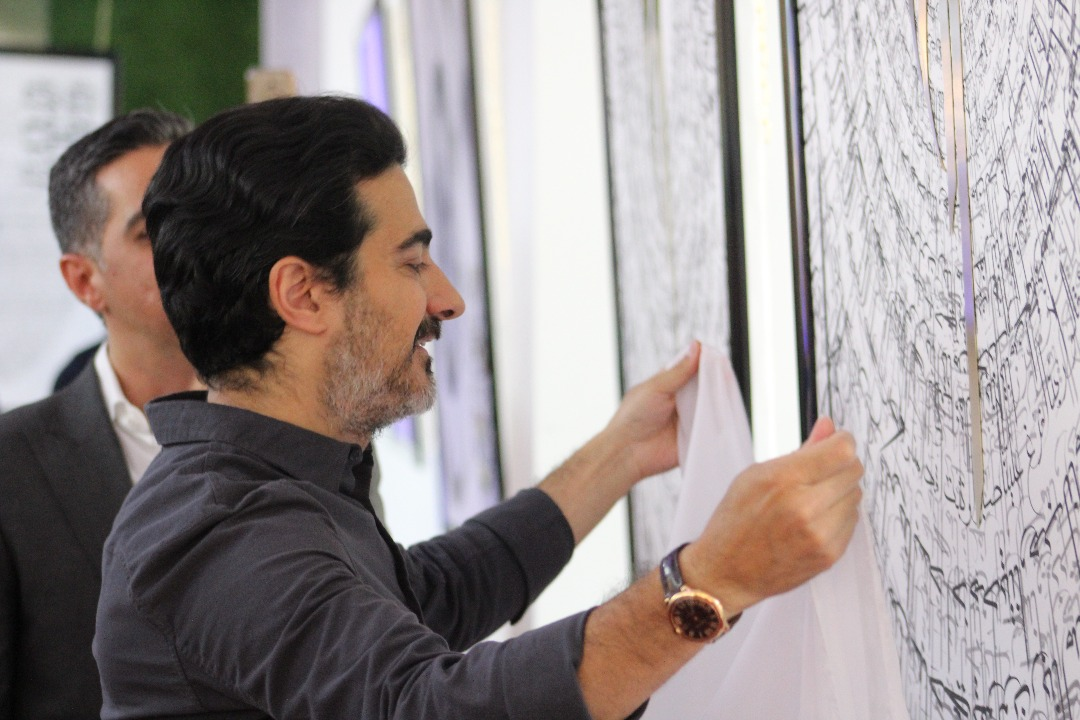
Unveiling of the Rabbana painting by Homayoun Shajarian (2017)

In 2018, Iranian conceptual artist Ali Rahimi Parsa (also known as Ali Parsa) created a pair of twin calligraphy paintings titled "Rabbana", inspired by the famous Quranic supplication. These works were publicly unveiled with the approval of Mohammad-Reza Shajarian and were signed by his son, Homayoun Shajarian, who also participated in the unveiling ceremony. According to the artist, the proceeds from the auction of these paintings are intended to support the creation of a cultural center named "Rabbana".
