= Keivan Saket =

Keivan Saket کیوان ساکت
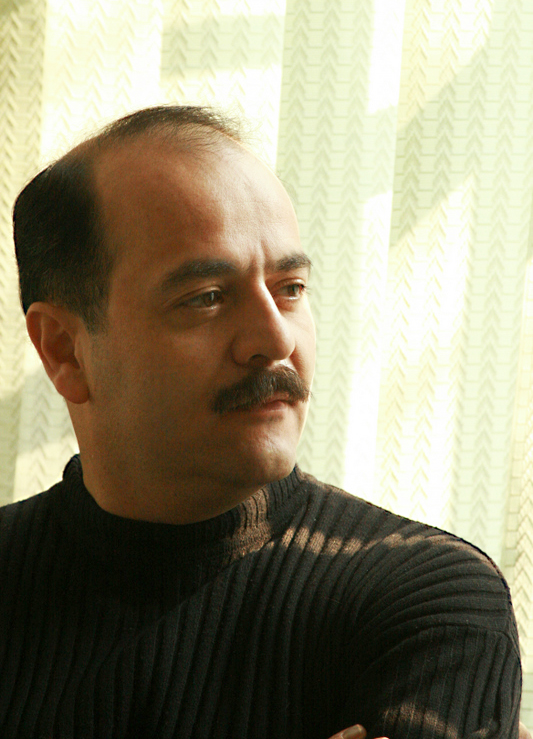
- Keivan Saket, 2008

Background information
- Born: 1961 (age 64–65); Mashhad, Iran
- Occupations: Instrumentalist, composer, university professor
- Instruments: Tar, Setar, Guitar
- Website: http://www.keivansaket.com

Keivan Saket (Persian: کیوان ساکت) (born 1961 in Mashhad) is an Iranian composer and university professor and Tar and Setar Player, and author of 12 books for Tar and Setar.

== Early life ==
Keivan Saket was born in 1961 to a family in Mashhad. He began music and painting from childhood with the support of his parents. He was a pupil of painting masters such as Sadegh Pour in drawing, Master Pirasteh in coloration and Master Davvalo in watercolor.

His first music lessons came from his uncle, Manochehr Zamanian, in Children and Teenagers’ Music Workshop founded in Mashhad by National Broadcasting Organization under the management of Morteza Delshab. After a short time Manochehr Zamanian left Mashhad in order to pursue his education. Some time later, his townsman and his uncle's friend Hamid Motabassem, came to Mashhad and started teaching in the same workshop. He had taught music in Arts Academy of Tehran, and for two successive summers before the Islamic Revolution he continued teaching there. After the Islamic Revolution Motabassem moved to Mashhad and became friends with Saket. After some time he returned to Tehran and then went overseas.

== Career ==
Keivan Saket founded the Vaziri Band in 1996 and performed many works with this band. In 1990 he was invited as a musician and a soloist to Aref band by Parviz Meshkatian. The result of this cooperation is works like Afshari Morakkab, Ofoqe Mehr, Vatan Man sung by Iraj Bastami, and Magham-e Sabr composed by Master Meshkatian with Saket's tar and setar solo.

Concerts inside and outside of Iran were among Saket's activities. He founded The Big Orchestra of Keivan Saket with more than 60 musicians and singers. The group had many successful concerts in Tehran.

== Works ==
=== Albums and performances ===
- Jãmeh-Darãn Tar and Setar soloing in Esfahan, Shoor and chãrgãh
- Sabokbãl 18 Chãhãr Mezrãb written in the book of Sabokbal
- Ey Vatan remaking and performing some of the works of Alinaghi Vaziri with singing of Fazel Jamshidi and piano playing of Hooman Khalatbari
- Becoming familiar with Dashti melody, performing some lessons of second book new teaching styles of Tar and Setar
- Fasaneh performing Abo Ata, Rast Panjgah with Vaziri Orchestra with singing of Iraj Bastami
- Didare Shargh Va Gharb performing Morgh-e Sahar with singing of Fazel Jamshidi and performing 8 famous songs of the world composed by West stars with Tar and piano accompanying of Maziar Heydari
- Ghasedak Setar soloing accompanying vocalizing poem by Zhale Sadeghian one of the contemporary poets
- East of Sorrow performing Tar and stringed orchestra in the first two sections: Iranian and then music of West different eras with cooperation of Omid Nikbin, Navid Mostafa Pour and Behnam Abolghasem
- Bi Carvan koli performing works composed by Saket with Vaziri Orchestra with singing of Iraj Bastami in tune of Shooshtari and Shoor
- Mah Banoo old popular songs Sadigh Tarif melody
- Shargh Andooh
- Illuminations
- Ballad of Cypress
- Naghmehye Mehr (Not released in Iran)
- Composition, making and performing ten programs in the style of Golhaye Javidan. Naghmehaye Javidan ordered by Music Unit of National Broadcasting Organization, vocalized by Zhale Sadeghian and Saket soloing and Hasan Nahid (reed) and Mahmood Mohammadi (clarinet) and Sina Jahanabadi (Kamancheh) and performing of Vaziri Orchestra and singing of Salar Ahgili – Reza Rezaee – Mohsen Roh Afza – Amir Tafti and Fazel Jamshidi
- Making 15-minute programs under the title of Ghowl va Ghazal (Word and Lyric), performing with Setar for recognizing and decomposition and analysis of Iranian music row in two description: one what he has written in his books one and the other Mirza Abdollah’s one.
- Mitaravad Mahtab with Salar Aghili’s singing
- Raghse Angoshtan (memorial of Moscow trip captured in Chaikovsky Conservatory)
- Key Miresad Baran with Sina Sarlak's singing and Hormoz Naser Sharifi's poems

=== Books ===
- Tar & Setar in 12 volumes, 6 of which has been published
- Allegre 18 four plectrums for Tar and Setar
- The Wave the note of a number of songs of East of Sorrow and Illuminations albums
- Perpetual Movement 20 Useful Studies for the Tar and Setar
- Charkhe-E-Niloofari 20 Useful studies for Tar and Setar
- Eight Famous Song of the World notes of classic songs in the album of Sharg va Gharb (East and West)
- The Solace of the Willow (15 simple four plectrums)
- Practical radif of Iranian Classical Music
