= Mojgan Shajarian =

Mojgan Shajarian مژگان شجریان
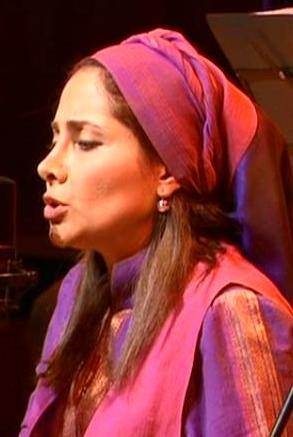
- Shajarian in 2011

Background information
- Born: 17 May 1970 (age 56); Tehran, Pahlavi Iran
- Origin: Mashhad, Iran
- Genres: Persian traditional music
- Occupations: Vocalist, musician, painter, graphic designer
- Instrument: Setar

Mojgan Shajarian (Persian: مژگان شجریان, born 17 May 1970) is an Iranian painter, graphic designer, vocalist and setar player. She is the daughter of musician Mohammad-Reza Shajarian and sister of Iranian singer Homayoun Shajarian.

== Early life and education ==
Mojgan Shajarian was born on 17 May 1970 in Tehran. She holds a bachelor's degree in painting and a master's degree in graphic communication from the Islamic Azad University. She also has a bachelor's degree in music from the University of the Arts.

Shajarian is married to Mohammad Ali Rafiei, who served as concert director for Mohammad-Reza Shajarian and later for Homayoun Shajarian. They have a daughter named Mehr and twin sons named Sam and Sepehr.

=== Educational background ===
- Learning setar with Mohammad-Reza Lotfi and Hossein Alizadeh in 1979
- Learning radif with Parviz Meshkatian in 1981
- Learning radif with Mehrabano Toufigh at the Tehran University of Art in 1989

== Shahnaz group ==
Mohammad Reza Shajarian founded a music group named Shahnaz in 2008, in honor of Jalil Shahnaz, a renowned tar player. Mohammad Reza Shajarian works with Mojgan Shajarian's daughters within this group.

== Arghavan ==
Her first independent album was released in April 2019 under the title Arghavan. This album was composed by Sorena Sefati. The album uses poems by poets such as Hushang Ebtehaj, Mohammad-Reza Shafiei Kadkani and Hafez. Mojgan Shajarian says about the name of this album: "The name Arghavan tells the story of the suffering of the people of our land, as well as those who have been forced to emigrate but have never taken root in their homeland." Regarding the restrictions on the release of music albums with women's voices in Iran, Mojgan Shajarian published a post on social media: "Due to the unjust laws governing our country, it is not possible to publish Arghavan's album, and for this reason, Arghavan is available for free on the Internet to those interested in Iran."

== Artistic activity ==
- Performed in a concert with Sima Bina in 1991 in Tehran
- Graphic design of the works of Mohammad-Reza Shajarian and Homayoun Shajarian since 1993
- Solo and Vocal performance with Mohammad-Reza Shajarian in a London concert with the Shahnaz Group (April 2010) (officially broadcast by BBC)
- Setar playing in the concert of Mohammad-Reza Shajarian and Shahnaz Group in Dubai, Shahnaz Group Concert in Tehran, Rendan-e Mast and Morgh-e Khoshkhan
- In 2019, she was part of Sourena Safati's NuAeen Ensemble, which toured
- For the 2022 documentary about her father The Voice of Dust and Ash, she performed the song "Dust and Ash" (by J. Ralph) together with Norah Jones, which was shortlisted for the Academy Awards. Mohammad-Reza Shajarian was scheduled to record the song but died before doing so.
