= Aref Ensemble =

Persian classical music ensemble

The Aref Ensemble (in Persian: گروه عارف) was a Persian classical music ensemble. It was founded by maestro Parviz Meshkatian, Hossein Alizadeh, and Mohammad Reza Lotfi in 1977. The group was named after Aref Ghazvini, early 20th century Iranian poet and composer. Aref was dedicated to the promotion and advancement of Persian classical music. To some critics the Aref Ensemble, together with the Sheyda Ensemble (also founded by Meshkatian), revolutionised Persian music.

In 1992, Meshkatian and the Aref Ensemble won first prize in the Spirit of the Earth Festival in England.

== Vocals ==
- Mohammad Reza Shajarian
- Shahram Nazeri
- Iraj Bastami
- Hamid Reza Nourbakhsh
- Alireza Eftekhari

== See also ==
- Music of Iran
- Masters of Persian Music
- Chemirani ensemble
- Zoufonoun Ensemble
- List of Iranian musicians
