= Hushang Ebtehaj =

Iranian poet (1928–2022)

- امیرهوشنگ ابتهاج
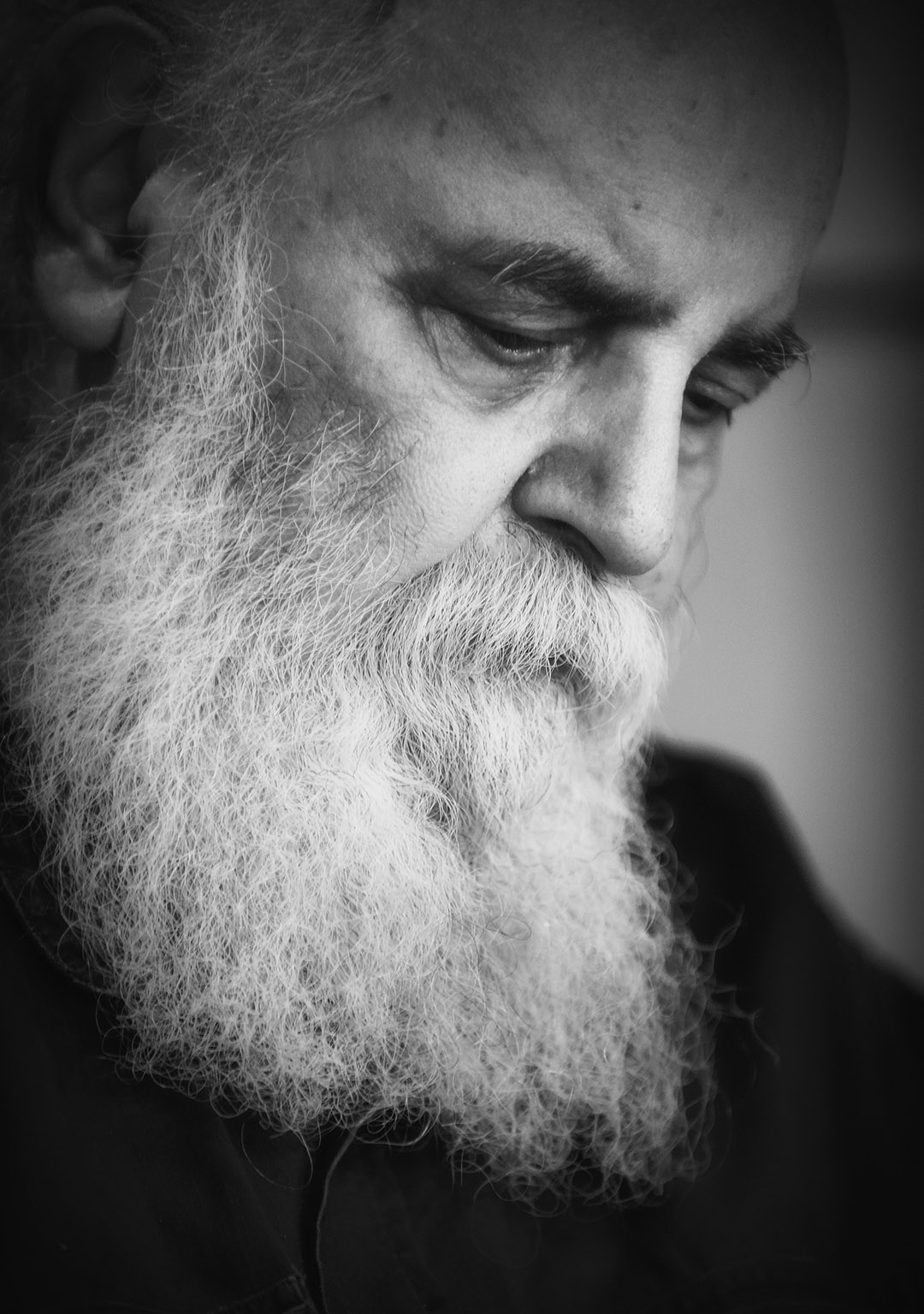
- Ebtehaj in 2013
- Born: Amir Hushang Ebtehaj; 26 February 1928; Rasht, Gilan, Iran
- Died: 10 August 2022 (aged 94); Cologne, North Rhine-Westphalia, Germany
- Resting place: Rasht, Iran
- Citizenship: Iran; Germany
- Spouse: Alma Maikial (m. 1959; died 2022)
- Children: 4
- Relatives: Ala Ebtekar (great nephew), Golchin Gilani (cousin)
- Writing career
- Pen name: H. E. Sayeh
- Language: Persian
- Genre: Poet

Signature
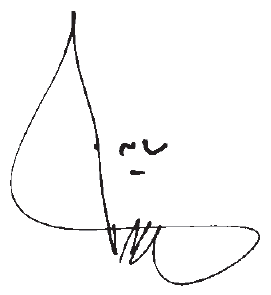

Amir Hushang Ebtehaj (Persian: امیر هوشنگ ابتهاج; 25 February 1928 – 10 August 2022), also known by his pen name H. E. Sayeh (Persian: ه.ا.سایه, lit. Shadow), was an Iranian poet of the 20th century, whose life and work spans many of Iran's political, cultural and literary upheavals.

== Life ==
Ebtehaj was born 25 February 1928 in Rasht in a prominent Baháʼí family in Iran and had his primary schooling there before moving to Tehran. His first book of poetry, with an introduction by eminent poet Mehdi Hamidi Shirazi, was published when he was 19 years old. During Iran's open period following World War II, Sayeh got involved in various literary circles and contributed to various literary magazines such as Sokhan, Kavian, Sadaf, Maslehat, and others. Unlike many other literary figures of the time who got deeply involved in politics and left-leaning activities, Sayeh stayed true to his social and political consciousness but refrained from deeper involvement. He was employed at the National Cement Company for 22 years while continuing his literary activities. Later he was invited by the National Iranian Radio to produce the traditional music program Golhaye Taze and "Golchin Hafte."

After the 1979 Iranian Revolution and the ensuing suppression, Sayeh spent a year in prison for his writings. After he was released, he began to work on "Hafez, by Sayeh," a verse-for-verse study of the various publications of Hafez. In 1987, he moved to Cologne, Germany, with his family and lived there, but he visited Iran several times a year.

Sayeh died from kidney failure at his home in Cologne on 10 August 2022 at the age of 94.

== Poetry ==
Sayeh published his first poetry collection while still a high school student in the northern province of Gilan, Iran. His total output, however, remains small because of his preoccupation with increased craftsmanship and exact phraseology. In the political climate of the 1940s, Sayeh was an ardent advocate of the poetry of social commitment. His early poetry reveals his concern with purposive literature.

Sayeh has also written a collection of lyrical poems (ghazal) in the classical style. Here, he reveals an easy mastery of traditional forms—the lyrical ode, in particular—which he uses to celebrate both the sacred and the secular moments of life. Sayeh's poetry, at times highly emotional, is always remarkable for its convincing directness and unconcealed sentiment. A number of his lyric poems, ballads and poems have been performed by famous Iranian singers such as Mohammad Reza Shajarian, Alireza Eftekhari, Shahram Nazeri, Hossein Ghavami and Mohammad Esfahani.

== Works ==
Poetry

- The First Songs, 1946 (نخستین نغمه‌ها)
- Mirage, 1951 (سراب)
- Bleak Travails I, 1953 (سیاه مشق ۱)
- Nocturnal, 1953 (شبگیر)
- Earth, 1955 (زمین)
- Pages from the Longest Night, 1965 (چند برگ از یلدا)
- Bleak Travails II, 1973 (سیاه مشق ۲)
- Until the Dawn of the Longest Night, 1981 (تا صبح شب یلدا)
- Memorial to the Blood of the Cypress, 1981 (یادگار خون سرو)
- Bleak Travails III, 1985 (سیاه مشق ۳)
- Bleak Travails IV, 1992 (سیاه مشق ۴)
- Mirror in Mirror, Selected Poems, 1995 (آینه در آینه)

(selected by M.R. Shafie-Kadkani)

- Dispirited, 2006 (تاسیان) (non-ghazal poems)

Other

- Hafez, by Sayeh, 1994 (حافظ به سعی سایه)

Please note: English names of books are not official, but the Wikipedia author's translation. See talk page.

== Poems in translation ==
Translations by Mojdeh Marashi and Chad Sweeney:

- “Arghavaan.” Washington Square Journal, 2008
- “Search/Circle” and “Moan of the Mirror.” Poetry International 12, 2008
- “Kayvaan Was a Star,” “Sterile,” “The Fall,” and “Bird in the Cage.” Pingpong, Henry Miller Library Journal, Issue 3, 2008.
- "Sunset on the Green" and "Image." Subtropics, Issue 6, Fall 2007.
- “Fright,” “Life” and “The Few Thousand Hopes of the Children of Adam.” Crazyhorse Issue 72, 2007.
- “Night’s Alley.” American Letters & Commentary 19, 2007.
- “The Art of Stepping Through Time” and “Black and White.” Indiana Review 29.2, Winter 2007.
- “Maybe,” “Story” and “Dove’s Wings” Seattle Review, Spring 2007.
- “Numbers” and “Red.” Fourteen Hills, Fall 2005.

== See also ==
- Persian literature
- Intellectual movements in Iran
