= The Voice of Dust and Ash =

2022 documentary film

The Voice of Dust and Ash is a feature-length documentary by first time Iranian-American director Mandana Biscotti, about Maestro Mohammad-Reza Shajarian. The film gives a first hand chronological account of Shajarian's life, through the animated prism of the unofficial national anthem for Iranian freedom, "Morq-e Sahar".

The film was nominated for two Hollywood Music in Media Awards in the category of Best Music in a Documentary and Best Song. On 17 December 2022, it was announced that the song "Dust and Ash" (by J. Ralph, performed with Norah Jones and Shajarian’s daughter, Mojgan) was shortlisted for the Academy Awards.
