= Sepideh Raissadat =

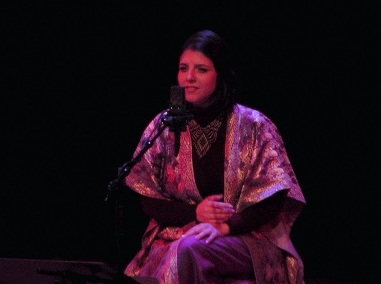
- Sepideh Raissadat, Amsterdam, 2012

Background information
- Born: 1980 (age 45–46); Tehran, Iran
- Genres: Persian classical music, Persian traditional music
- Occupations: Singer, setar performer

Sepideh Raissadat (Persian: سپیده رئیس‌سادات) is a classical Persian music singer.

== Biography ==
Sepideh Raissadat was born in Tehran in 1980. She began studying Radif (the repertoire of Persian classical music) at the age of 9 with the famous Persian singer Parisa, and continued with Parviz Meshkatian and Mohammad Reza Lotfi. Her major soloist instrument is the setar. Her first album was recorded when she was 18, thanks to Ostad Parviz Meshkatian.

After she finished her B.A. in Painting, she moved to Italy to pursue her artistic education. She graduated in Musicology, majoring in Ethnomusicology, from the University of Bologna. She was invited by the Vatican and different Italian TV channels, and performed as a soloist with one of the oldest Italian choirs. She performed with the most well-known Italian musicians such as Franco Battiato, and Andrea Parodi.

She has academically researched pre-Islamic ancient Persian music. Currently, her major research area is focused on Sassanid music.

== Albums ==
- Persian Songs, performed with Nexus, composed by Reza Ghassemi. August 2015.
- Tambour inopiné, composed by Reza Ghassemi. September 2014.
- Rhapsody of Roses, composed by Iman Vaziri. July 2014.
- Tale of Friendship, composed by Iman Vaziri. October 2011.
- 14 Cheerful Pieces, composed by Reza Ghassemi. Published by Buda Records, October 25, 2010.
- Anwar – From Samarqand to Costantinople on the Footsteps of Maraghi. Published by Felmay, 1 September 2010.
- Konje Sabouri, composed by Ostad Parviz Meshkatian
- Khonyagar, composed by Mehdi Azarsina
