= Ali Reza Eftekhari =

Alireza Eftekhari
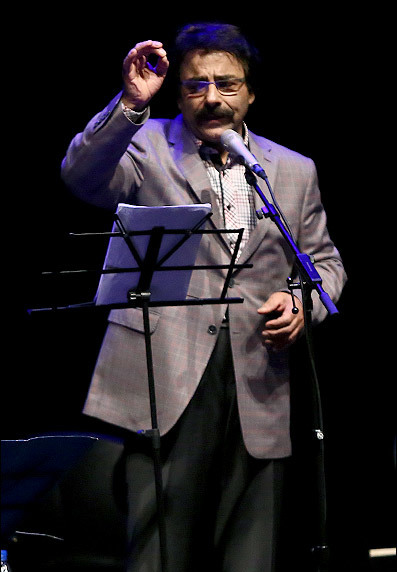
- Born: Alireza Eftekhari Mahyari; March 30, 1958 (age 68); Isfahan, Iran
- Occupation: Singer
- Musical career
- Genres: Persian Traditional Music; Persian Pop
- Instrument: Vocals
- Years active: 1978–present

Ali Reza Eftekhari (Persian: علیرضا افتخاری; born March 30, 1958) is an Iranian vocalist of Iranian classical and popular music. He is one of the most popular singers in Iran and his works are among the best-selling works of Iranian music. This singer has released more than seventy music albums so far. He is known as the man of a thousand faces of Iranian music.

He is considered one of the contemporary artists associated with the promotion of classical Iranian music and has contributed to introducing the genre to younger audiences.

== Career ==
Alireza Eftekhari was born in 1958 in Isfahan. As a child, he studied with Tabatabai, a violinist. From the age of 12, he studied vocal lines with Taj Esfahani. After a while, he started to use the teachings of Jalil Shahnaz and Hassan Kasaei in the field of traditional music. In 1978, Ali Tajvidi won the first place in the Barbad exam and in the presence of Ali Akbar Shahnazi, Dariush Safvat, and Ali Tajvidi. He has been studying music with Gholamreza Dadbeh since 1981. In 1983, he released his first album on the advice of Faramarz Payvar called "Atash Del" and in memory of Taj Esfahani. After three years, Eftekhari performed works such as Raz va Niaz in collaboration with Hossein Alizadeh and Mehrvarzan in collaboration with Mohammad Ali Kiani-Nejad. In the early years of the 1981s, Eftekhari also had private performances with Hassan Kasaei, Habibollah Badiei, Gholam Hossein Bigjehkhani, and Jalil Shahnaz, all of which were single-copy and never published.

== Biography ==
Eftekhari learned music from several well-known Iranian musicians, including Taj Isfahani and Ali Tajvidi. Ali Reza Eftekhari is one of the most prolific Iranian vocalists. Eftekhari is a popular and prolific Persian singer. He put significant effort into changing the situation of popular music in Iran. In his own words: "In order to introduce pop music to Iranian music culture, I have made myself a scapegoat."

== Discography ==
=== Album ===
- Atashe Del (1983) with Faramarz Paivar
- Mehrvarzan (1985)
- Hamtaye Aftab (1986) with Emad Raam
- Raz o Niaz (1988) with Hossein Alizadeh
- Darigha (1990)
- Karevan (1991)
- Gharibestan (1991)
- Raz e Gol (1993) with Mojtaba Mirzadeh
- Sarve Simin (1995)
- Naze Negah (1995)
- Sarmastan (1995)
- Maqame Sabr (1994) with Parvize Meskatian
- Mehman e To (1995) with Jamshid Andalibi
- Niloufarane (1996) with Abbas Khoshdel
- Zibatarin (1996)
- Aman Az Jodaei (1997)
- Afsaneh (1998)
- Tazeh Be Tazeh (1998)
- Hengameh (1998)
- Niloufarane 2 (1999) with Abbas Khoshdel
- Yade Ostad (1998) with Ali Tajvidi
- Sedayam Kon (1999)
- Atre Soosan (1999)
- Paiez (1999)
- Khodahafez (1999)
- Shaban Ashegh (2000)
- Mastaneh (2000) with Jalal zolfnun
- Gole Hezar Bahar (2000)
- Gole Mikhak (2000)
- Nasima (2001) with Fazlollah Tavakol
- Shokohe Eshgh (2002)
- Babatahir (2003)
- Ghame Zamane (2004)
- Sayad (2005) with Mohammadreza CheraghAli
- To Miayi (2006) with Hassan MirzaKhani
- Ghalandarvar (2007) with Emad Tohidi
- Navaye Asatid (2008) with Jahanbakhsh Pazooki
- Ashegha Salam ..... (2008)
- Gereftar (2010)
- Shab KocheHa (2010)
- Jame Mosaffa (2012)
- Khaneh Doost Kojast (2013) with sohrab sepehri poems
- Padeshahe Faslha (2014) with Hossein Parnia

=== Single Track ===
- Maryam Mirzakhani (2017)
- Better Days (2017)
- Liberation (2015)

== film musics ==
- Amirkabir (TV Mini-Series) (singer) - 1985
- Shabhaye Zayendeh-Rood (singer) - 1990
- An Umbrella for Director (vocal) - 2002
- The Fifth Sun (TV series) (singer) - 2010-2011

== Significant concerts ==
- music performance by the Iran's National Orchestra. Lead singer Alireza Eftekhari accompanied the group on the fourth night of the 32nd Fajr International Music Festival at Tehran’s Vahdat Hall on January 16. Fereidun Shahbazian led the group.
- music performance by the Iran's National Orchestra. Lead singer Alireza Eftekhari accompanied the group in the Vahdat Hall and Nader Mortezapour led. The Concert was dubbed Story of Loyalty.

== See also ==
- Music of Iran
- Iran's National Orchestra
- List of Iranian musicians
- Persian pop music
