= Jalal Zolfonun =

Iranian musician (1938–2012)

Jalaal Zulfonun
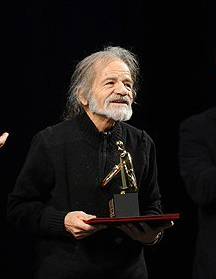
- Jalal Zolfonun at the Fajr International Music Festival (2012)

Background information
- Born: 7 March 1938; Abadeh, Imperial Iran
- Died: 18 March 2012 (aged 74) Karaj, Iran
- Genres: Persian music
- Occupations: Composer, Setar player
- Instruments: Setar, Tar
- Years active: 1968–2012

Jalaal Zulfonun (Persian: جلال ذوالفنون, romanized: Jalâl Zolfonun, pronounced [dʒæˈlɒːl zolfʊˈnuːn]; 7 March 1938 – 18 March 2012) was an Iranian musician, setaar player, and a prominent composer and teacher of Persian music.

== Early life ==
Jalal Zolfonun was born in Abadeh, Fars province, Iran, and received his earliest musical training from his father, Habib Zoufonoun, and his older brother, Mahmoud Zoufonoun on the tar.

== Career ==
At the age of 13, Zolfonun enrolled the National School for Iranian Music to study musical theory, composition and technique under Ruhollah Khaleghi and Musa Khan Maroufi. While he immediately fell in love with the setar, the instrument was not taken seriously at the time. He instead decided to study the tar, while also learning the violin from his brother Mahmoud Zoufonoun.

In 1967, Zolfonun was accepted into the faculty of the fine arts department of Tehran University, where he further studied the setar with Master Nur Ali Boroumand and Dariush Safvat.

From then on, he dedicated himself to the delicate instrument. He began combining the techniques of the older masters of setar (an Iranian instrument with four metal strings) with his own ingenuity and mystic sensitivity. For the first time, with Iran's leading classical singer Shahram Nazeri, he founded an ensemble composed of only setar players. Later, in the 1980s, Zolfonoun and Nazeri's compositions were released in two best-seller albums, one of which, Gol-e Sadbarg ("One hundred-petalled Rose"), is the best selling album of classical Iranian music ever.

At the same time, Zolfonun composed for the setar in mind, and would prove one of the most expressive, while technically virtuosic, players of the instrument. He showed the power and versatility of the setar as an ensemble and solo instrument that could fully express the nuances of Persian traditional music in any setting.

Following the success of Gol-e Sadbarg, Zolfonun continued to record a number of other albums on which he is featured as lead soloist, composer and/or ensemble player with a number of well-known singers and musicians with whom he also toured worldwide.

Between 1975 and 1980, he collaborated with French ethnomusicologist Jean During and also collaborated with French choreographer Maurice Béjart on combining Iranian music with European ballet dance.

In 1994, he performed concerts to present Iranian music to the majority of the world at the UN. He also collaborated with the DELA MUNOT Deauville Institute in Brussels to introduce Iranian music to Western European countries.

Zolfonun also wrote a seminal book, Setar Playing/Teaching Method.

He lived in Iran, but also toured outside in Europe, the US, Canada and Japan with his son, Soheil Zolfonoon, and other musicians.

Zolfonun died of heart disease on 18 March 2012 in Tehran; he had been hospitalized for two weeks prior to his death for heart failure.

== Discography ==
- Gol-e Sadbarg ("One Hundred-Petalled Flower") with masters Shahram Nazeri, Reza Ghassemi and Bijan Kamkar
- Atashi Dar Neyestan ("A Fire in the Reed-Bed") with master Shahram Nazeri
- Mastaneh with Alireza Eftekhari
- Parand
- Peyvand
- Kord Bayat (Music of the World)
- Del Aavaa
- Pearl Beads
- Sheydaee
- Mystic Journey (Music of the World)
- 18 Tasnif (Melodic Pieces for Setar)
