= Gol-e Sadbarg =

Studio album by Shahram Nazeri
- Released: 1984
- Genre: Traditional music
- Label: Khoshnava

Shahram Nazeri chronology
Gol-e Sadbarg (1984)	Yadegar-e Doust (1984)

Gol-e Sadbarg (Persian: گل صدبرگ, lit. 'The One-Hundred-Petalled-Rose'), is the debut album of Shahram Nazeri released in 1984, containing eight tracks. The album consisted exclusively of the lesser-known poems of Rumi and was released on the 800th anniversary of the birth of Rumi. The album became immensely successful and became the biggest selling album of both Persian music and Sufi music. Released amidst the Iran–Iraq War further generated its popularity due to the difficult times. Nazeri was accompanied with Setar players Jalal Zolfonun, Reza Ghassemi and Daf player Bijan Kamkar.

== Impact ==
The popularity of the album made Setar classes popular around Iran.

== Track listing ==
No.	Title	Length
1.	"Moghadame Chavoshi"
2.	"Pishdaramad & Tasnif (Darse Sahar)"
3.	"Avaz (Masnavi)"
4.	"Andak Andak (Tasnif)"
5.	"Old Chahar Mezrab-E Bayat Tork"
6.	"Dele Man Raye To Dare (Avaz)"
7.	"Ala Ya Ayohal Saghi (Tasnif)"
8.	"Ghate - Ye Zarbi"
Total length:		63:53
