= Masters of Persian Music =

Iranian well-known music artists

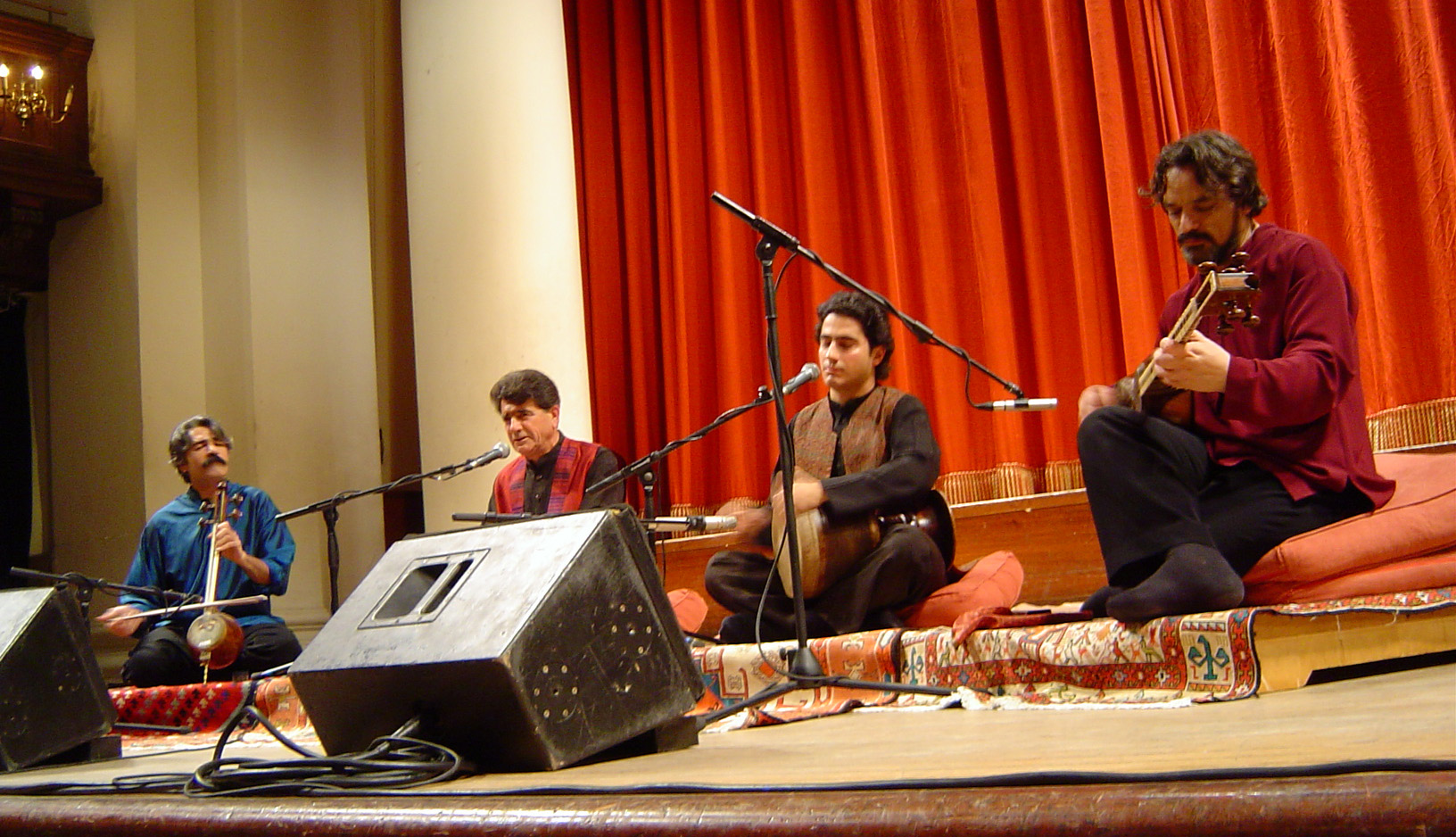
- Original ensemble members (from left) K. Kalhor, Mohammad-Reza Shajarian, H. Shajarian, and H. Alizâdeh

Background information
- Origin: Iran
- Genre: Persian classical music
- Labels: Delawaz Records; World Village

Masters of Persian Music is a Persian classical music ensemble (or "supergroup") founded in 2000 by four internationally recognized ustāds (masters) of the genre: vocalist Mohammad-Reza Shajarian; composer-musicians Hossein Alizâdeh and Kayhan Kalhor; and Mr. Shajarian's son, multi-instrumentalist singer Homayoun Shajarian.

The ensemble formed with a view to touring Europe and North America (where Kayhan Kalhor has lived for much of his adult life). Although not all of the four had collaborated previously, Mr. Shajarian had worked with Kalhor and Alizâdeh. In 1998 he sang for a studio album called Night, Silence, Desert, which Kalhor produced. He also sang the score that Alizâdeh composed for Ali Hatami's historical drama Del Shodegan (1992). Both albums were published on Delawaz Records, a label Shajarian started for the preservation of Persian classical singing.

== Performances ==
Kalhor saw the group as cultural ambassadors. They adopted the name Masters of Persian Music for touring abroad. (In Iran, they used to perform and record under their own names.) The first European tour began in 2000, followed by a voyage to North America in early 2001. However, due to visa difficulties, Alizâdeh missed the first nine of the 18 performances in North America, and the other members had to play without him. Nevertheless, the success of the tour led to another in 2002 (organized by the World Music Institute), and a third in 2005. During this period, they released three live albums: Zemestan ast ("It's Winter") in 2001, Bi to be sar nemishavad ("Without You") in 2002, and the double album Faryad ("The Cry") in 2003.

It's Winter (Persian: زمستان است) is a recording of the ensemble's first concert in California in 2001. The second album, Without You, was a nominee for the Grammy Award for Best Traditional World Music Album in the 46th Annual Grammy Awards. Faryad, recorded on a later tour, was nominated in 2005. 2005 also saw the release of Hamnava ba Bam, a DVD video of the ensemble's 2003 memorial and benefit concert in Tehran, which raised relief funds for survivors of the 2003 Bam earthquake. In 2007, Delawaz Records published the ensemble's two final live albums: Saz-e-khamoush (Persian: ساز خاموش) and Soroode-e-mehr (Persian: سرود مهر "October Song"). Between the concert tours, the members also continued to perform and record with other artists.

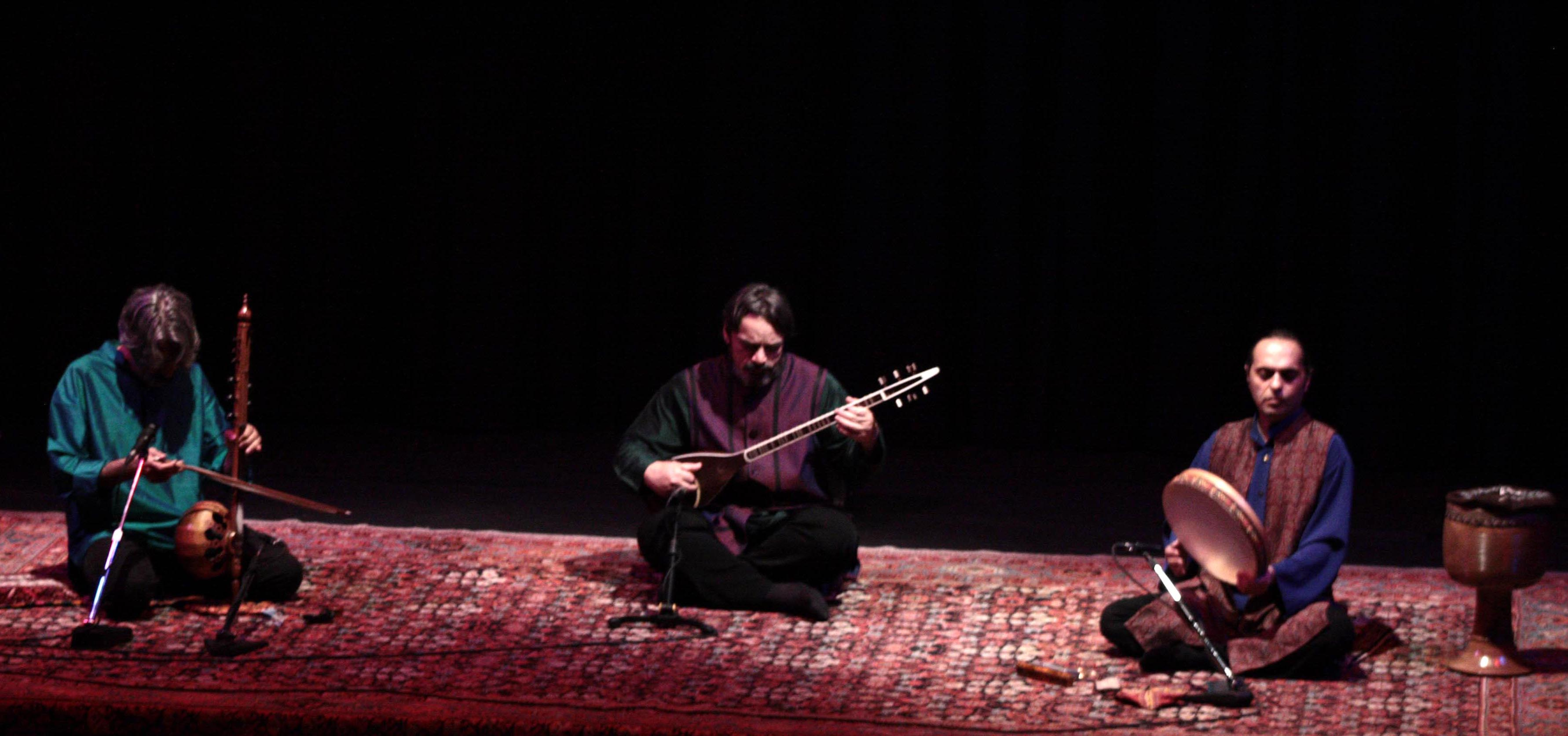
From left: Kayhan Kalhor, Hossein Alizâdeh, Majid Khalaj (15 August 2010)

Hossein Alizâdeh and Kayhan Kalhor toured Europe and North America again in 2010. In Europe they were accompanied by tonbak player Majid Khalaj, but for the North American tour they enlisted the support of five younger musicians; promoters billed them as "Masters of Persian Music: Three Generations". This expanded ensemble included Hamid Reza Nourbakhsh (voice), Fariborz Azizi (bass tar), Siamak Jahangiry (ney), Pezhham Akhavass (tonbak), and Rouzbeh Rahimi (santur).

Kalhor saw a need to reach out to younger Iranian musicians, since the Iranian Revolution of 1979 created a "generational divide" by widely barring music practice and performance—thus driving many musicians of the older generation out of the country. But, the original lineup is also multi-generational: In 2005, M. R. Shajarian was age 62, Alizadeh 52, Kalhor 40, and H. Shajarian 28. Kalhor says that Iranians see the group as a symbol of continuity in the culture's traditions.

=== Tours of North America ===
The ensemble has visited at least 18 cities in the United States and Canada:

Country	City	Tour year			
Country	City	2001	2002	2005	2010
Canada	Toronto, Ontario	?	?	18 February	5 February
Canada	Vancouver, British Columbia	?	date missing	20 February	?
United States	Atlanta, Georgia	?	?	10 March	26 February
United States	Austin, Texas	?	18 October	?	?
United States	Berkeley, California	10 February	?	27 February	13 February
United States	Boston, Massachusetts	4 March	date missing	12 March	19 February
United States	Chicago, Illinois	?	?	20 March	23 February
United States	Cleveland, Ohio	?	date missing	18 March	20 February
United States	Durham, North Carolina	2 March	11 October	?	?
United States	Honolulu, Hawaii	?	?	1 March	?
United States	Honolulu, Hawaii	?	?	2 March	?
United States	Irvine, California	?	?	?	12 February
United States	Ithaca, New York	?	date missing	?	?
United States	Los Angeles, California	?	?	26 February	10 February
United States	New York, New York	24 February	date missing	6 March	18 February
United States	New York, New York	24 February	date missing	13 March	18 February
United States	Portland, Oregon	9 February	?	?	?
United States	San Francisco, California	?	date missing	—N/a	?
United States	Saratoga, California	?	?	24 February	14 February
United States	Washington, D.C.	25 February	?	5 March	28 February

== See also ==
- Music of Iran
- List of Iranian musicians
