= Hamid Reza Noorbakhsh =

Persian classical vocalist and musician

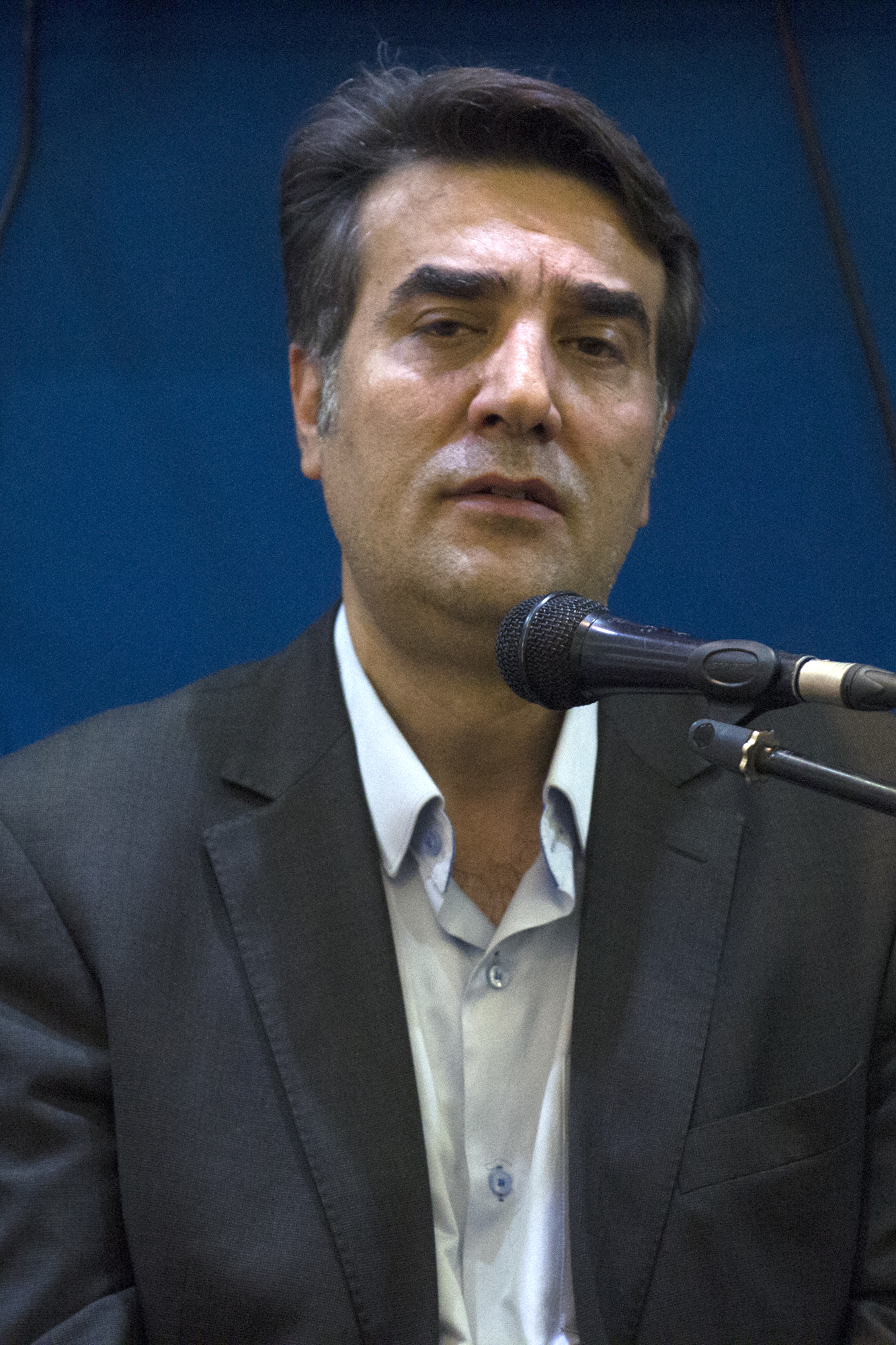

Hamid Reza Noorbakhsh (also spelt Nourbakhsh) is a Persian classical vocalist and musician.

== Career ==
He studied Iranian classical music under the supervision of Mohammad Reza Shajarian and has performed with several music ensembles, including the Shams Ensemble and the Aref Ensemble, as well as with the Ukraine Philharmonic Orchestra.

Noorbakhsh is currently the director of Iran's House of Music.
