= Mohammad-Reza Shajarian =

Iranian singer and musician (1940–2020)

Ostad Mohammad-Reza Shajarian
- محمدرضا شجریان
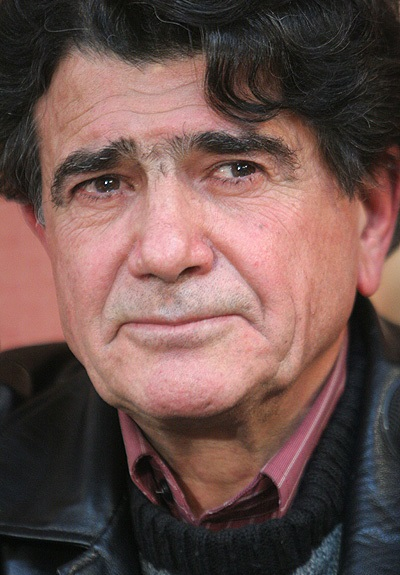
- Shajarian in 2007
- Born: 23 September 1940; Mashhad, Iran
- Died: 8 October 2020 (aged 80); Tehran, Iran
- Resting place: Tomb of Ferdowsi
- Education: Tehran Supreme University; Shah Reza School; School of National Music
- Occupations: Singer-songwriter; composer; calligrapher
- Spouses: Farkhondeh Golafshan (m. 1962; div. 1993) Katayoun Khansari (m. 1995)
- Children: 5, including Homayoun and Mojgan
- Musical career
- Genre: Persian traditional music
- Years active: 1959–2016
- Labels: Santur, Tonbak
- Formerly of: Aref Ensemble
- Website: mohammadrezashajarian.com

Signature
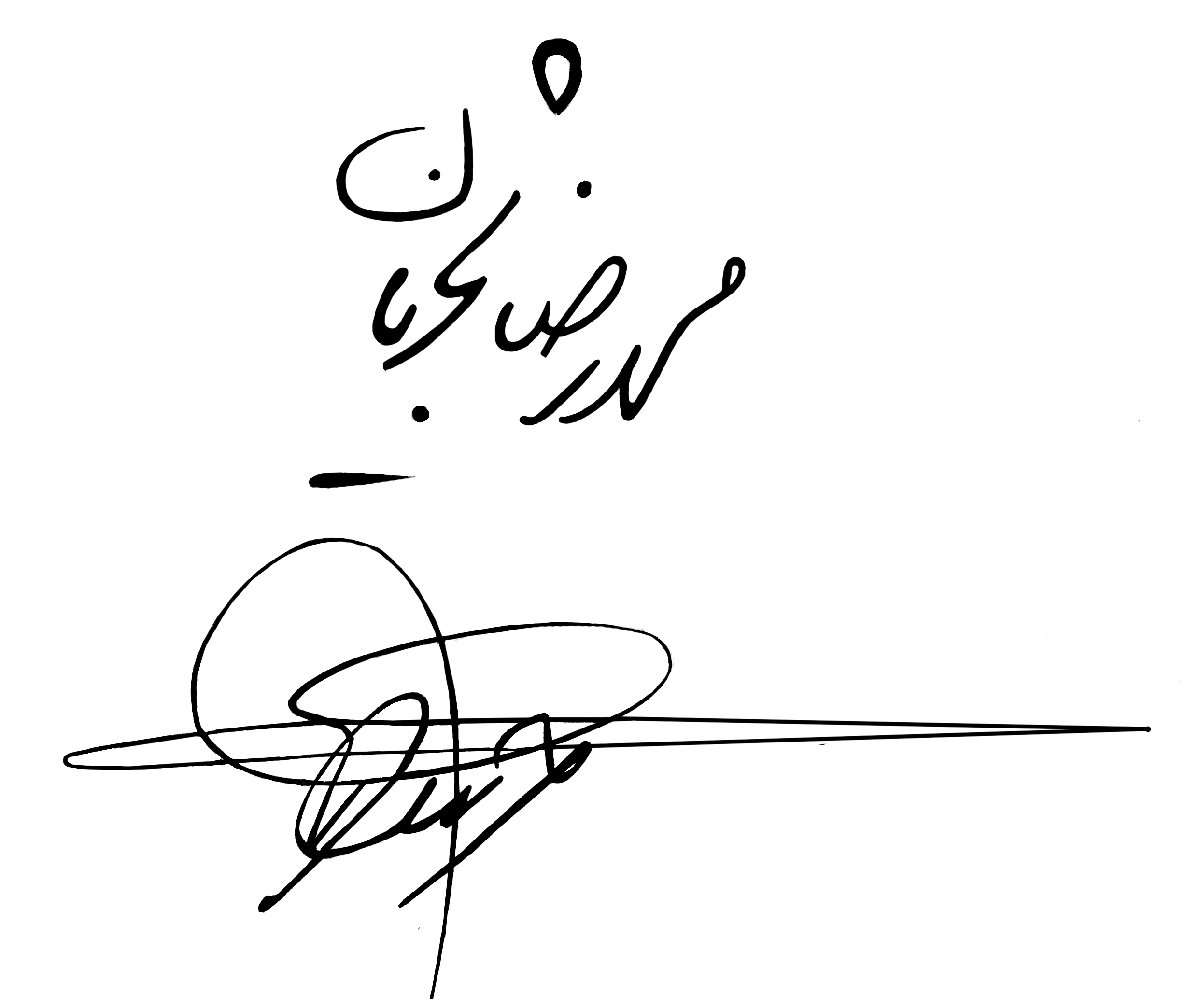

Mohammad-Reza Shajarian (Note: Persian: محمدرضا شجريان; Persian pronunciation: [mohæmːæd ɾeˈzɒː ʃædʒæɾiˈɒːn]) (23 September 1940 – 8 October 2020) was an Iranian singer and master (Ostad) of Persian traditional music. He was also known for his skills in Persian calligraphy and humanitarian activities. Shajarian started his singing career in 1959 at Radio Khorasan, rising to prominence in the 1960s with his distinct singing style.

Shajarian was one of the very few singers who managed to get permission to sing publicly after the 1979 revolution.

Shajarian's main teachers were Ahmad Ebadi, Esmaeil Mehrtash, Abdollah Davami, and Nour-Ali Boroumand. He also learned the vocal styles of singers from previous generations, including Reza Gholi Mirza Zelli, Fariborz Manouchehri, Ghamar Molouk Vaziri, Eghbal Azar and Taj Isfahani. He cited legendary Persian tar soloist Jalil Shahnaz as highly influential to his development, indicating that he often tried to mimic Shahnaz's playing style in his singing.

Shajarian collaborated with musicians such as Parviz Meshkatian, Mohammad Reza Lotfi, Hossein Alizadeh, Faramarz Payvar, Dariush Pirniakan, and Sohrab Pournazeri. He was recognized as a skilled singer in the challenging traditional Dastgah style. His works also cover some songs of Iranian ethnic music, including Mazandarani music, Azeri music, Kurdish music and Lur music.

UNESCO in France presented Shajarian with the Picasso Award in 1999 and with the UNESCO Mozart Medal in 2006. In 2017, Los Angeles Times cited him as the "Greatest living maestro of Persian classical music". After coming out in support of the Iranian Green Movement and criticizing the Iranian government, he was banned from holding concerts and releasing music.

== Early life ==
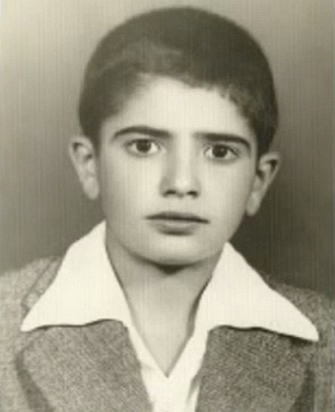
Shajarian as a teenager

Mohammad-Reza Shajarian was born on 23 September 1940 in Mashhad, Iran. His father, Mehdi, was a Qur'an reciter, a tradition that also existed in the family through Shajarian's grandfather, Ali Akbar. His mother, Afsar Shahverdiani, died in 2007. The eldest of five children, Shajarian began studying vocal techniques at the age of five under the guidance of his father, initially through the disciplined practice of Qur'an recitation.

== Music career ==
=== Early work ===
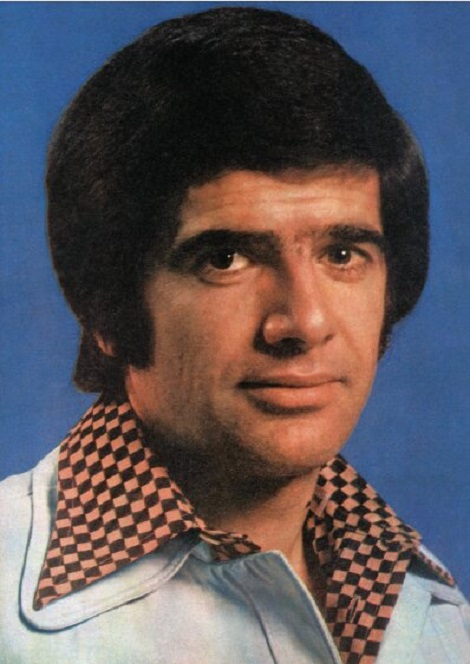
Shajarian in the 1960s

At the age of 12, he began studying the Persian classical repertoire known as the Radif without his father's consent as studying and performing music was against his father's religious beliefs. This may have been the reason why he chose the stage name "Siavash Bidakani" in his early career as a singer, which did not last long, and soon he used his real name again. Shajarian started his singing career in 1959 at Radio Khorasan, rising to prominence in the 1960s with his distinct style of singing. Since then his career has included teaching at Tehran University's Department of Fine Arts, working at National Radio and television, researching Persian/Iranian music, and making numerous recordings.

=== Music bands ===
Shajarian was not always in music groups, but he did the vocals for the Masters of Persian Music with his son Homayoun Shajarian, as well as two other ostads, Kayhan Kalhor and Hossein Alizadeh. He also performed with his daughter Mojgan Shajarian.

In 2008, he toured the world with the Ava Ensemble, composed of his son Homayoun (tombak and vocals), Hossein Behroozinia (barbat), Majid Derakhshani (tar), Hossain Rezaeenia (daf), and Saeed Farajpouri (kamanche).

In 2012, he toured with the Shahnaz Ensemble with his daughter Mojgan and other band members. The ensemble is named after master tar musician Jalil Shahnaz, with a percentage of the proceeds going towards supporting his health care needs.

=== Masters and students ===
Shajarian studied with Esmaeil Mehrtash, Ahmad Ebadi and Nour-Ali Boroumand.

He learned the vocal styles of previous singers such as Hossein Taherzadeh, Reza Gholi Mirza Zelli, Qamar-ol-Moluk Vaziri, Eghbal Azar, and Taj Isfahani.

He started playing the santour under the instruction of Jalal Akhbari to understand better and perform the traditional repertoire. In 1971, he was introduced to Faramarz Payvar and took santour lessons with him. Shajarian also learned Abolhasan Saba's vocal Radif from Payvar.

He also studied under the guidance of master Abdollah Davami, from whom he learned many early Persian songs. Davami also passed on to Shajarian his interpretation of the Radif.

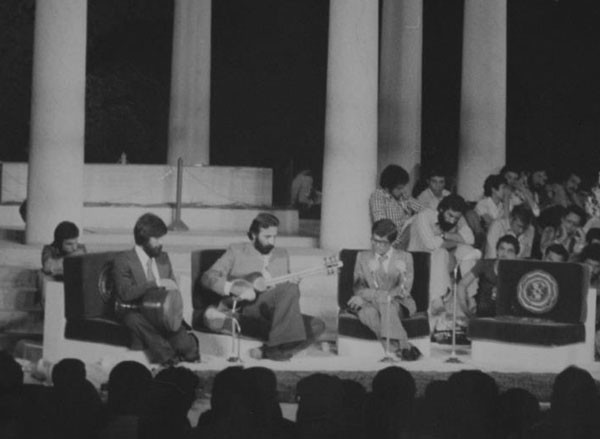
Shajarian at Shiraz Arts Festival

Shajarian taught many students in the field of singing, some of whom are:

- Iraj Bastami
- Ali Jahandar
- Shahram Nazeri
- Hesameddin Seraj
- Mozaffar Shafei
- Qasem Rafati
- Mohammad Esfahani
- Homayoun Shajarian
- Ali Rostamian
- Mohsen Keramati
- Mojgan Shajarian
- Hamid Reza Noorbakhsh
- Sina Sarlak
- Mojtaba Asgari

=== Creating instruments ===
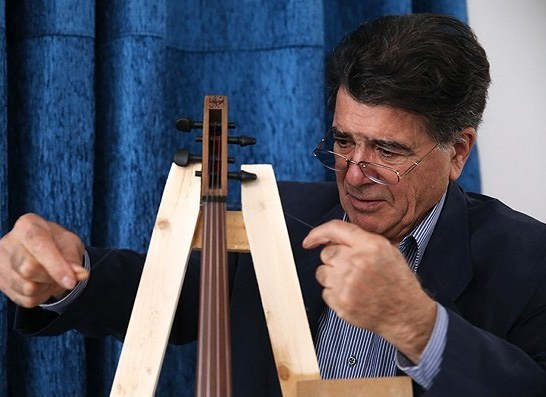
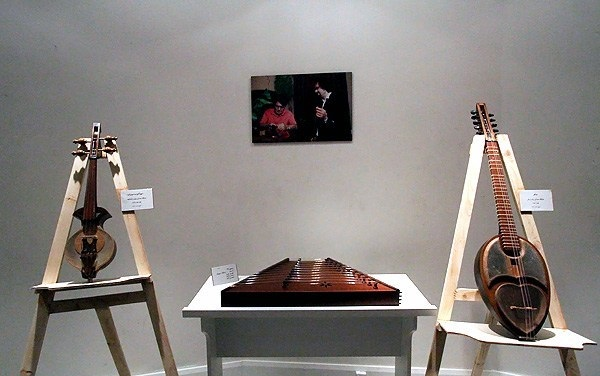
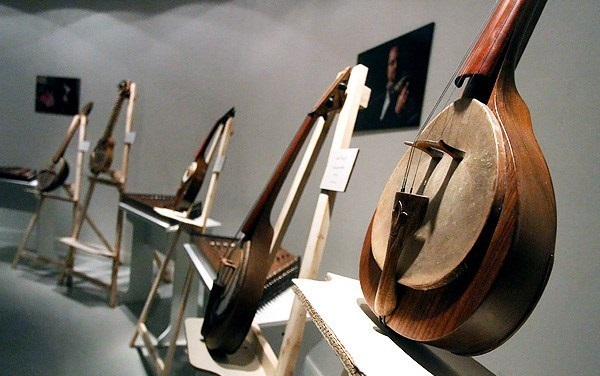
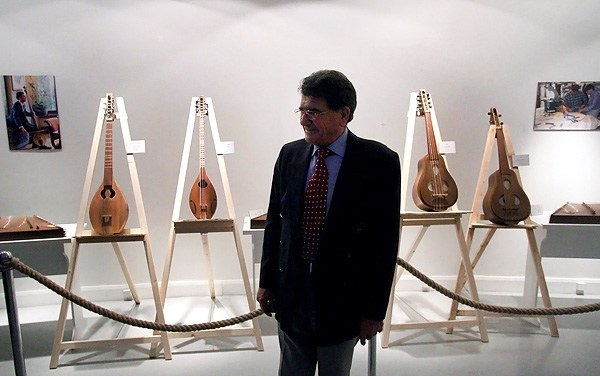
Shajarian with some of his instruments

Shajarian is the creator of many instruments. The first exhibition of his instruments was held in May 2011, the second in September 2013 at the House of Artists by the Del Avaz Cultural and Artistic Institute.

== Significant works ==
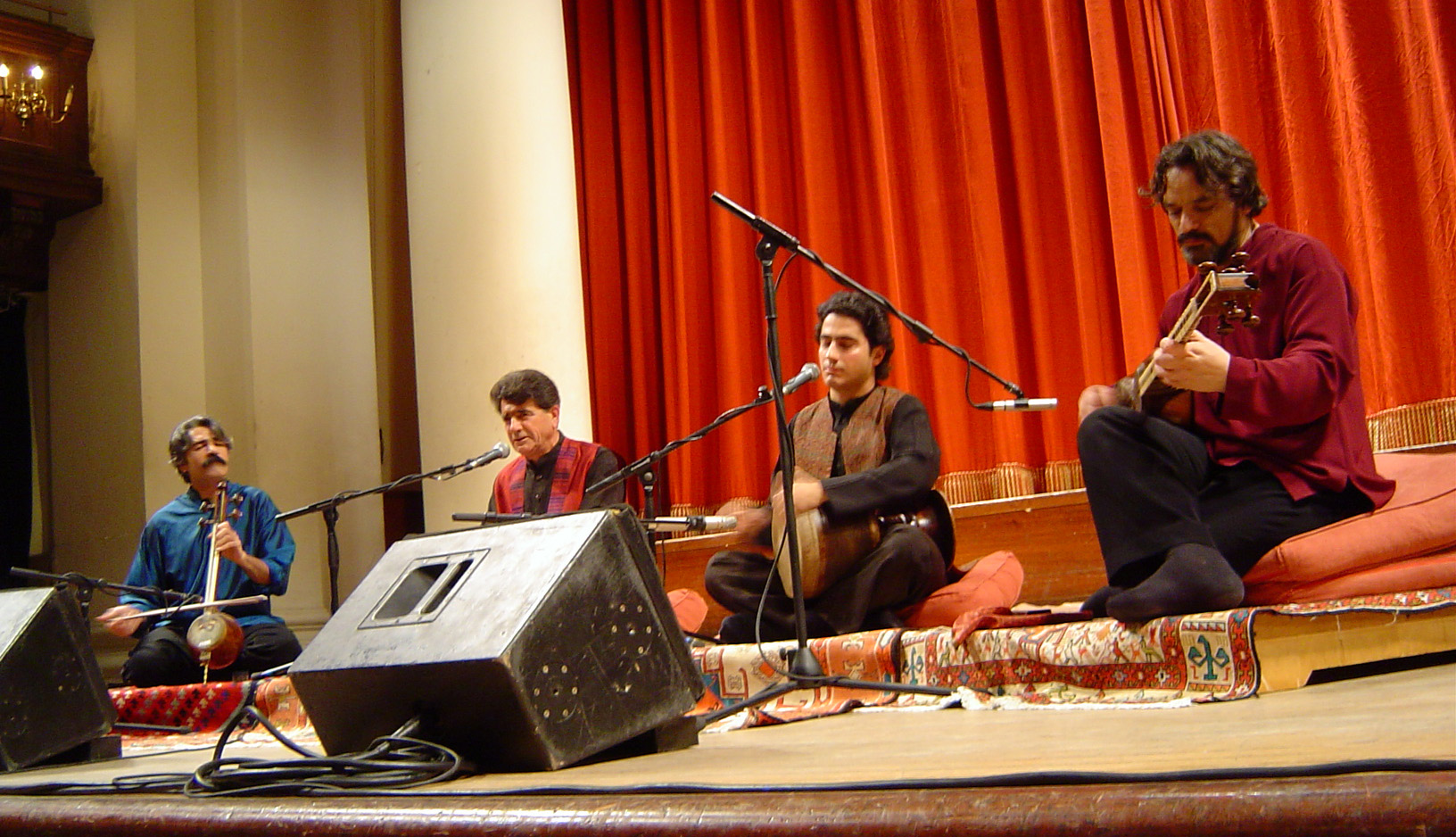
Shajarian (second from left) at a concert in London

- Raast-Panjgaah concert with Mohammad Reza Lotfi in Raast-panjgaah (1976).
- Chehre be Chehre with Mohammad Reza Lotfi in Navaa (1977).
- Golbang-e Shajarian, Part 1 (Bot-e Chin) features: Ali Akbar Sheida (Ballads), Fereydoun Shahbazian (Composer), Faramarz Payvar (Santur), Houshang Zarif (Tar). Part 2 (Dowlat-e Eshq) features Hassan Yousefzamani (Composer), Ahmad Ebadi (Setar), Ali Asghar Bahari (Kamancheh). Poetry by Hafez, Saadi and Baba Taher (1977).
- Eshgh Daanad with Mohammad Reza Lotfi in Aboo Ataa (1981).
- Aastaan e Jaanaan with Parviz Meshkatian and Naaser Farhangfar in Bayaat e Zand (Turk) & Sur (1982).
- Peyvande Mehr (album) with Farhang Sharif (1984).
- Bidaad with Parviz Meshkatian and the Aref Ensemble in Homaayoun (1985).
- Be yaad e Aaref with Mohammad Reza Lotfi in Bayaat e Turk (1986).
- Nava – Morakkab Khaani with Parviz Meshkatian and the Aref Ensemble in Navaa, Se-gaah and Dashti (1986).
- Doud-e-Oud with Parviz Meshkatian and the Tehran Symphony Orchestra in Navaa (1987).
- Dastan with Parviz Meshkatian and the Aref Ensemble in Chahaar-Gah (1987).
- Dastgah Chahargah (live version of Dastan) concert with Parviz Meshkatian and the Aref Ensemble recorded live in Bonn (1987).
- Ghaasedak with Parviz Meshkatian and Homayoun Shajarian (1994).
- Dar Khiaal with Majid Derakhshani in Segaah & Bayaat e Zand (Turk) (1995).
- Zemestaan Ast with Hossein Alizadeh and Keyhan Kalhor in Maahoor and Homaayoun (1999).
- Night, Silence, Desert (Persian: Shab, Sokoot, Kavir) with Keyhan Kalhor based on the folk music of Khorasan. Traditional Crossroads (2000).
- Bi To Be Sar Nemishavad with the Masters of Persian Music Ensemble in Navaa and Bayaat e Kord (2002).
- Faryaad with the Masters of Persian Music Ensemble in Raast-panjgaah (2003).
- Devoid Grail with Fereydoun Shahbazian in Mahour and Dashti (2004).
- Serr-e-Eshgh with Parviz Meshkatian and Mohammad Mousavi in Maahoor.
- Sepideh Album with Mohammad Reza Lotfi and Sheyda Ensemble in Maahoor.
- Cheshmeye Noush with Mohammad Reza Lotfi and Majid Khaladj in Raast-panjgaah.

== Politics ==
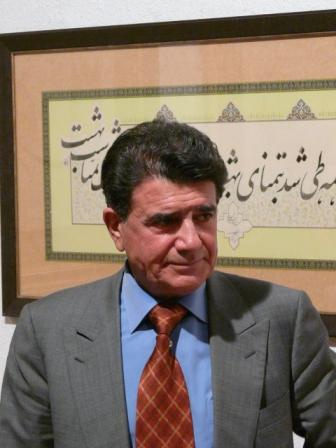
Shajarian in 2008

Shajarian's Bidaad album was recorded after a three-year hiatus from a commercial recording. The album's lyrics speak of a wonderful place having been reduced to shambles and bloodshed, in which he sings in sadness, "what happened?". When giving a lecture at California State University, Sacramento on 2 March 2012, he was asked what the lyrics of this song meant. His response made it clear that he chose these lyrics based on what happened to the Iranian regime after the revolution – a once beautiful country being reduced to shambles. This is widely considered his first commercial recording meant to represent the voice of an oppressed people in Iran.

Shajarian has indicated support for Iranians protesting against the 12 June 2009 Iranian presidential election results. When Iran's president, Mahmoud Ahmadinejad referred to the protesters as "dust and trash", Shajarian told a BBC Persian channel telephone interviewer that he (Shajarian) considered himself the voice of dust and trash: "It is the voice of dust and trash, and it will always remain the voice of dust and trash." He also asked IRIB (Islamic Republic of Iran Broadcasting) to stop broadcasting his songs. He mentioned that his famous song "Iran, Ey Saraye Omid" (Iran, the land of Hope), has no relation with the current situation of his country.

After Shajarian criticized the government publicly and sided with the Green Movement protesters, the state broadcaster IRIB banned his work of art, which used to be a fixture of public broadcasting until then. Even against Shajarian's will, the state TV and radio stations stopped airing Rabbana, a prayer sung during the Muslim fasting month of Ramadan heralding the moment of fast-breaking. The recital had been broadcast regularly every Ramadan since the 1979 revolution but swept from public view after the legendary singer fell out of favor with the establishment. A Shajarian fan in Tehran told The Guardian Ramadan without Rabbana was like Christmas without Christmas carol. In the elections of 2013 and 2017, Hassan Rouhani criticized the ban on broadcasting Shajarian's works and demanded that Shajarian's works be broadcast on television and radio.

In an interview in 2016, Shajarian stated that "my criticism was a mistake of one person, I am not against the republic system. Our music has always been attacked or criticized by a class of religious people. Of course, some of the deviant music can be like this. But the nature of music is not deviant. I myself am fundamentally opposed to deviant music. We accept the clergy and religion".

Lyrics of his song "Language of Fire," issued in September 2009, — "Lay down your gun, Come, sit down, talk, hear. Perhaps the light of humanity will get through to your heart too" — are thought by some observers to speak "directly to the plainclothes Basiji militiamen and security forces" who had beaten protesters during recent unrest.

In an interview with Hamid Reza Nourbakhsh in 2016, Shajarian said that he was not against the Islamic Republic and that his protest was only against one person (Mahmoud Ahmadinejad). "We say you have no right to insult the people. This is not a fall with the whole system."

Shajarian continues: "Several years ago, we had a concert in Stockholm with the Aref group, led by the living memory of Parviz Meshkatian. As soon as we were present on the group stage, they started chanting. They chanted against the Islamic Republic. The children in the group were all upset. When they chanted, we just sat and listened, and they chanted. They saw that we were not doing anything. Some ordinary people who came also shook hands with us to start our work. I also told Parviz to perform the last ballad and then go. We had two parts of the program, in each of which there were five ballads, and we only performed the last ballad, and we got up and went out, and the children brought their instruments. I told the person announcing the program to say behind the microphone. In honor of those who bought tickets and came from far and near, we performed this ballad. And get your money back and go. Later it turned out that the organizer was one of them, so I came backstage and told him as much as I could.

== Later life, death and legacy ==
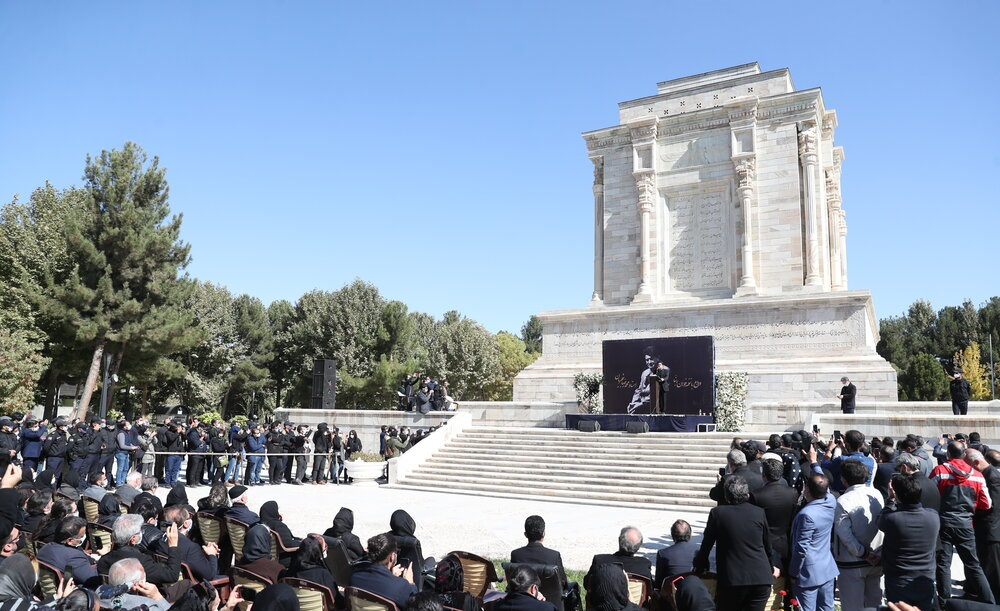
Funeral ceremony of Shajarian at the Tomb of Ferdowsi, October 2020

While in exile, Shajarian privately sat for a series of rare interviews that form the basis of a feature-length documentary entitled The Voice of Dust and Ash. In a leaked clip of the documentary, Shajarian can be heard saying, "I am Mohammad Reza Shajarian, son of Iran. My voice is part of Iran's ancient culture, to remind the people of the world that we have had a culture of love, peace and friendship." The clip went viral on social media twice, once in 2016 and again upon Shajarian's death in 2020. Shot in California and Iran, the interviews occurred shortly before he announced his cancer diagnosis and the rapid deterioration of his health. They now constitute his last public testament.

In March 2016, Shajarian revealed that he had had kidney cancer for the past fifteen years. He appeared with shaved hair in his Nowrouz congratulation video, published on his YouTube account. Bahram Beyzai composed a poem after announcement of Shajarian's illness and described it as a sad day in happy days of Nowruz.

Shajarian transferred to hospital on 27 January 2020 and had a successful surgery. He was released from hospital on 25 August but was hospitalized again on 5 October.

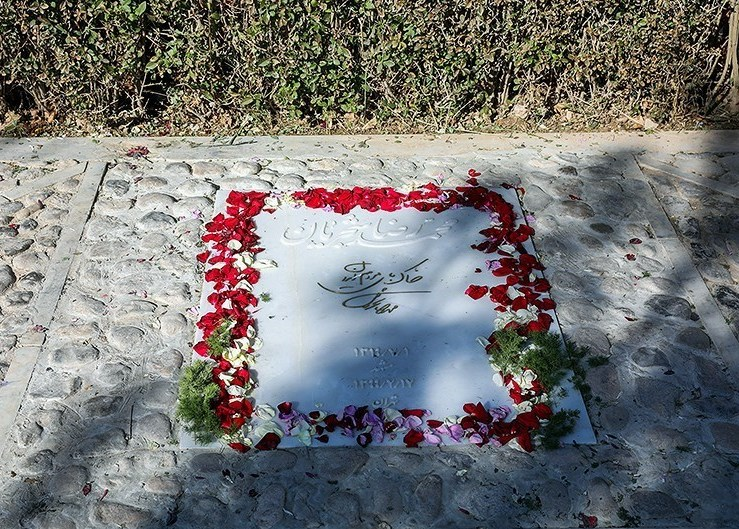
Shajarian's tombstone in the grounds of Tomb of Ferdowsi

Shajarian died on 8 October 2020 at the age of 80 at intensive care unit of Jam Hospital in Tehran. The cause of his death was not immediately made public. A private religious ceremony was held the following day at Behesht-e Zahra in Tehran, before his body being transferred to Mashhad. He was buried at the Tomb of Ferdowsi in Tus, Mashhad, on 10 October.

== Personal life ==
In 1962, Shajarian married teacher Farkhondeh Golafshan when he was 21 years old. They had one son Homayoun and three daughters, Farzaneh (a.k.a. Raheleh), Mojgan and Afsaneh. Afsaneh married Parviz Meshkatian. Shajarian and Golafshan divorced in 1993.

His second marriage was to Katayoun Khansari, sister of his son's wife, in 1995. The couple had one son, Ryan who was born in 1997 in Vancouver, Canada.

== Awards and distinctions ==
Awards and nominations
Award	Wins	Nominations
Grammy Award	0	2
Bita Award	1	0
UNESCO Picasso Gold Medal	1	0
Medal of Creativity	1	0
Legion of Honour	1	0
Order of Mozart	1	0
Legion of Honour	1	0
Aga Khan Foundation Award	1	0
A Great Symbol Of Art For Peace	1	0

Totals (Note: Certain award groups do not simply award one winner. They acknowledge several different recipients, have runners-up, and have third place. Since this is a specific recognition and is different from losing an award, runner-up mentions are considered wins in this award tally. For simplification and to avoid errors, each award in this list has been presumed to have had a prior nomination.)
- Wins: 8
- Nominations: 2

- NIRT Golden Cup (1977)
- Golden Picasso Medal (1999)
- Nominated for Grammy Award for Best Traditional World Music Album (2004, 2006)
- Nushin Medal (2008)
- The UNESCO Mozart Medal (2006)
- One of NPR's 50 great voices. (2010)
- French National Order of the Legion of Honour (2014)
- National Order of Merit (2014)
- Aga Khan Music Awards by the Aga Khan Trust for Culture (2019)

== Discography ==
=== Released music albums ===
Some of the following albums are joint works between Mohammad-Reza Shajarian and Shahram Nazeri or Homayoun Shajarian. Among these works are composers such as Mohammad-Reza Lotfi, Parviz Meshkatian, Hossein Alizadeh and Faramarz Payvar.

- Robaeiat-e Khayyam (1972)
- Chavosh 1 (Be Yad-e Aref) (1977)
- Golbang-e Shajarian (1978)
- Chavosh 2 (1978)
- Sepideh (Chavosh 6) (1979)
- Chavosh 7 (1979)
- Jan Jan (Chavosh 9) (1979)
- Raz-e Del (1979)
- Entezar-e Del (1979)
- Peyvand-e Mehr (1984)
- Astan-e Janan (1985)
- Bidad (1985)
- Serr-e Eshgh (Mahoor) (1986)
- Nava, Morakabkhani (1986)
- Dastan (1988)
- Saz-e Ghese Goo (1988)
- Dood-e Ood (1989)
- Del-e Majnoon (1990–1991)
- Khalvatgozideh (1991)
- Payam-e Nasim (1991)
- Sarv Chaman (1991)
- Asman-e Eshgh (1991)
- Delshodegan (1992)
- Yad-e Ayyam (1992)
- Cheshmeye Noosh (1993)
- Bahariyeh (1994)
- Gonbad-e Mina (1994)
- Jan-e Oshagh (1995)
- Peygham-e Ahl-e Del (1995)
- Dar Khial (1996)
- Rosvaye Del (1996)
- Eshgh Danad (1997)
- Shab-e Vasl (1997)
- Moamaye Hasti (1997)
- Chehreh Be Chehreh (1998)
- Shab, Sokout, Kavir (1998)
- Aram-e Jan (1998)
- Ahang-e Vafa (1999)
- Booye Baran (1999)
- Zemestan Ast (2001)
- Bi To Besar Nemishavad (2002)
- Faryad (2002)
- Hamnava Ba Bam (2003)
- Jam-e Tohi (2004)
- Saz-e Khamoosh (2007)
- Sorood-e Mehr (2007)
- Ghoghaye Eshghbazan (2007)
- Konsert-e Mohammad-Reza Shajarian Va Gorooh-e Ava (2008)
- Konsert-e Mohammad-Reza Shajarian Va Gorooh-e Shahnaz (Randan-e Mast Va Morgh-e Khoshkhan) (2008)
- Ah Baran (2009)
- Zaban-e Atash (2009)
- Randan-e Mast (2009)
- Konsert-e Mohammad-Reza Shajarian Va Gorooh-e Shahnaz Dar Dubai (2010)
- Morgh-e Khoshkhan (2011)
- Ranghaye Taali (2013)
- Tarigh-e Eshgh (2016)
- Khorasaniat (2019)
- Deylaman (Unknown date)

=== Film title singer ===
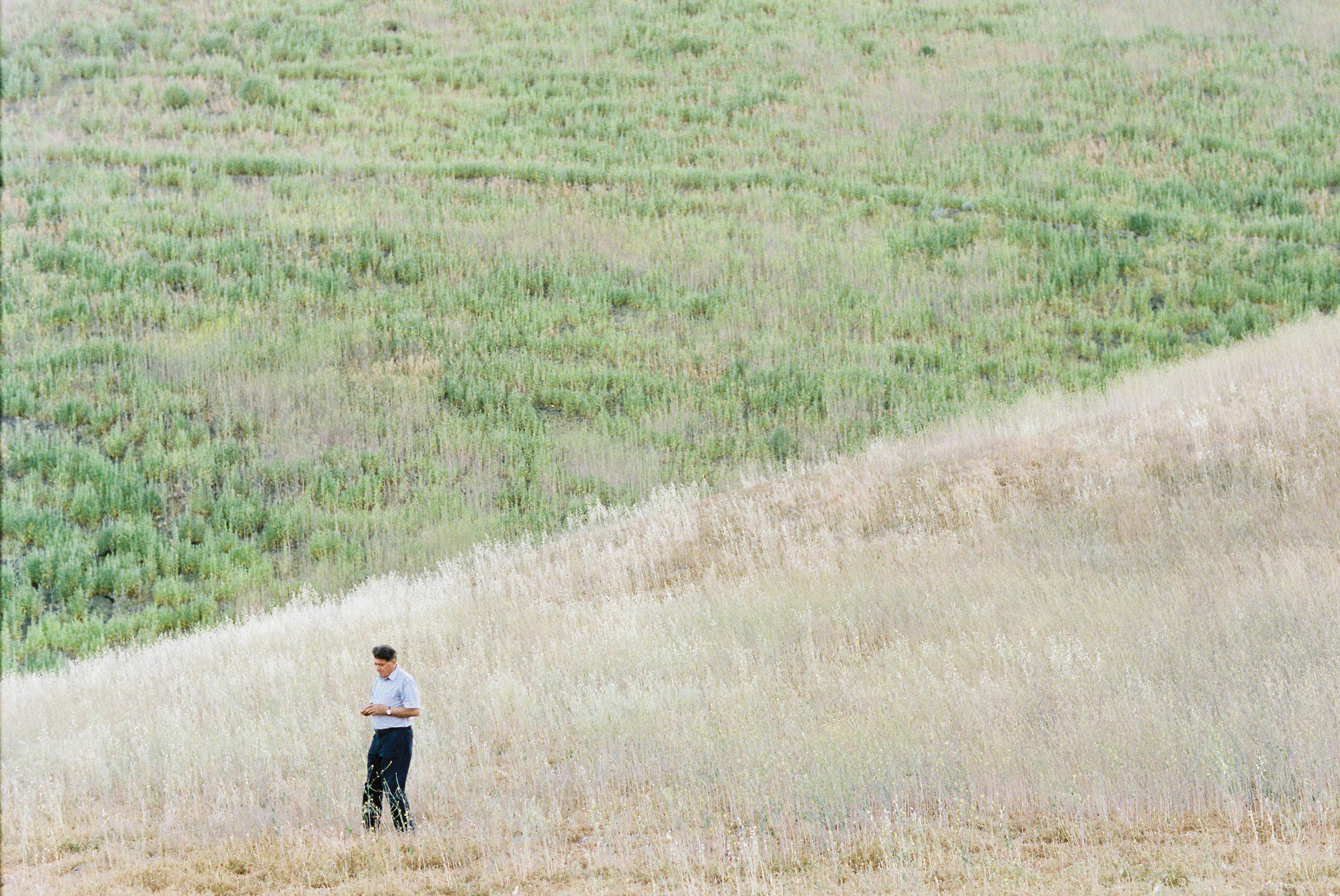
"I am Mohammad Reza Shajarian, Son of Iran."

- Love-stricken (1991)
- Abjad (2002)
- It is Winter (2005)

== See also ==
- List of Iranian musicians
- Music of Iran
- National Iranian Symphony Orchestra
