= Shahram Nazeri =

Iranian singer, musician and tenor

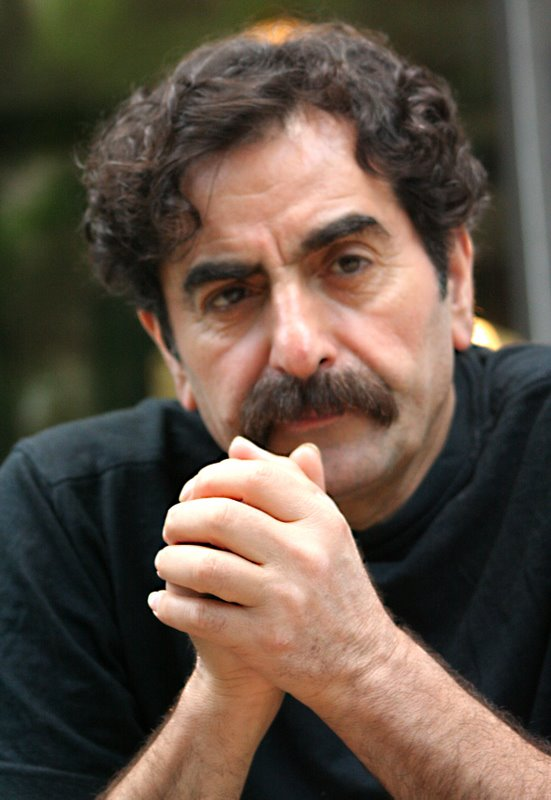
- Nazeri in 2006

Background information
- Born: 18 February 1950 (age 76); Kermanshah, Iran
- Genres: Kurdish music, Persian music
- Occupations: Singer, Composer
- Instrument: Setaar
- Years active: 1958–present

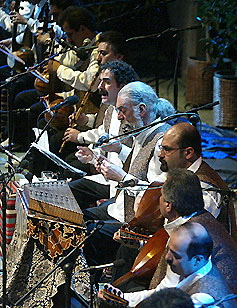
Shahram Nazeri & Parviz Meshkatian

Shahram Nazeri (Sorani Kurdish: شەهرام نازری, romanized: Şehram Nazirî, Persian: شهرام ناظری; born 18 February 1950) is a contemporary Iranian tenor of Kurdish origin from Kermanshah, Iran, who sings Sufi music, classical and traditional Kurdish and Persian music. He has been accompanied by some of the masters of Iranian traditional music such as Jalil Shahnaz, Hossein Alizadeh, Jalal Zolfonoun, Parviz Meshkatian and Faramarz Payvar. He has also worked with his son Hafez, a composer.

Nazeri was the first musician to include Rumi's poetry within Persian music, thus establishing a tradition of Sufi music within both Persian classical music and Kurdish music.

== Career ==
Shahram Nazeri has been established as a significant artist in Iran since the 1970s. His first albums which were in the form of mutual albums with Mohammad-Reza Shajarian, were published by the Chavoush institute by the end of the late 1970s. The content of these albums were filled with liberalism and patriotic ideas.

Nazeri has released over forty recordings to date. His 1984 album The One Hundred-Petalled Rose (Gol-e Sadbarg) has held the record for the highest selling album of Persian classical music and Sufi music in history. His musical talents were first nurtured by his mother at a very young age. Throughout his childhood, he was under the tutelage of the most renowned masters of Persian music including Abdollah Davami, Nourali Boroumand, and Mahmood Karimi. At eleven, he performed on the national Iranian television live for the first time. By age 29, he had gained a loyal fan base. He has continued to perform in Iran and abroad over the course of the last two decades. He has performed at major venues worldwide, including The Festival of Avignon, Theâtre de la Ville in Paris and The Tokyo Summer Festival.

At his concert in Kermanshah in 2014, he performed a Kurdish song containing the lyrics: "I am from Kermanshah, I don’t speak Persian," prompting condemnation from Iranian authorities, and accusations of Kurdish nationalism.

In 2019 he cancelled his annual concert in Konya, Turkey due to Turkey's offensive into Rojava in Syria with the following statement and has not performed in Turkey since.

“This year, I will not do the concert in (the Iranian month of) Azar in Konya in solidarity with the sufferings of the Kurdish women, men and children of Syria and to show respect for the selfless and lovely people of my country, because Rumi is the voice of human conscience and the herald of peace and friendship in the world. He has always composed the lesson of goodness, humanity and love in seventy thousand couplets.”

== Albums ==
1. Chavosh (1978)
2. Seda Sokhan Eshgh (1979)
3. Bad Sadah
4. Nowrouz (1981)
5. Gol-e Sadbarg (1984)
6. Yadegar-e Doust (1984)
7. Kish (1986)
8. ShourAngiz (1988)
9. Saqinameh 2 (1988)
10. Aatashi in Neyestan (1988)
11. Dele Sheida (1988)
12. Layla and Majnun (1989)
13. Laleh Bahar (1990)
14. Dar Golestaneh (1996)
15. Shour Angiz (1996)
16. Mystified: Poetry of Rumi (1997)
17. Song of Myths (2000)
18. Ghame Ziba (2003)
19. Lulian (2005)
20. Shahram Nazeri and the Dastan Group (2006)
21. Voice of Endearment (2007)
22. The Passion of Rumi (2007)
23. Safar Asrat (2009)
24. Bi Gharaar (2010)
25. Molaviyeh (2011)
26. Shahram Nazeri Live in Concert (2012)
27. Az Sedaye Sokhan-E Eshgh (2013)
28. Who Is in Love (2017)
29. Arash Kamangir (2019)
30. Through Eternity (2019)
31. Ey Del Be Kooyeh Eghsh (2019)

== Awards ==
- Chevalier des Arts et Lettres, by France, 2007.
- Lifetime Cultural Heritage Award, by Asia Society, in 2007.
- Simorgh award, by the International Institute for Dialogue among Cultures and Civilizations, 2007.
- Hafez Film Awards for Best Original Song, Hafez Film Awards, 2015.

== Gallery ==
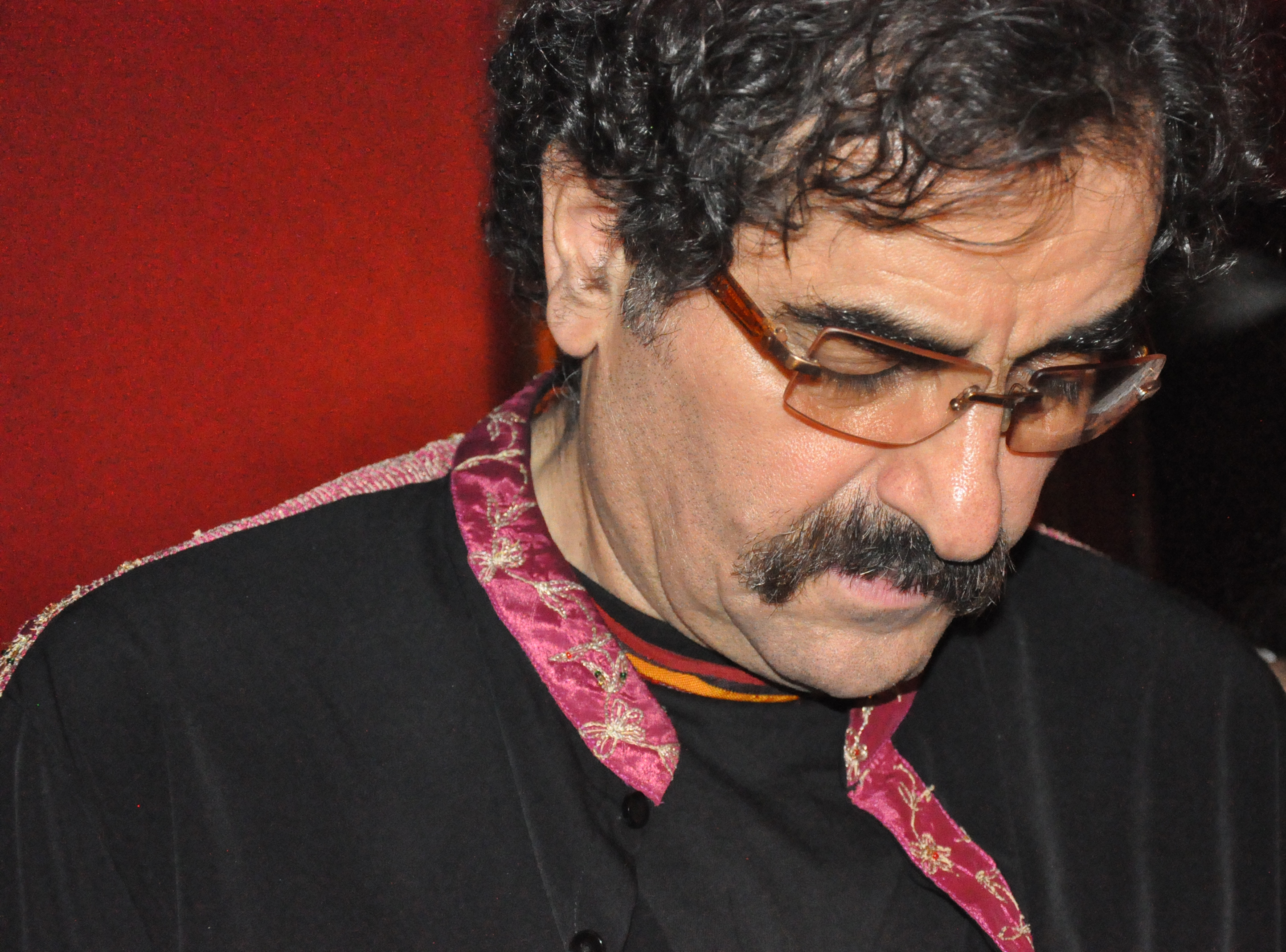
Maestro Shahram Nazeri

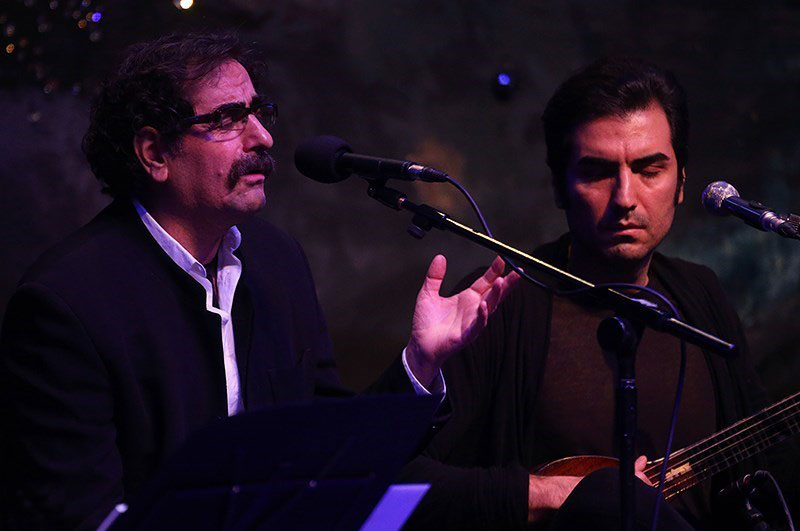
Shahram and Hafez Nazeri Concert in Tehran

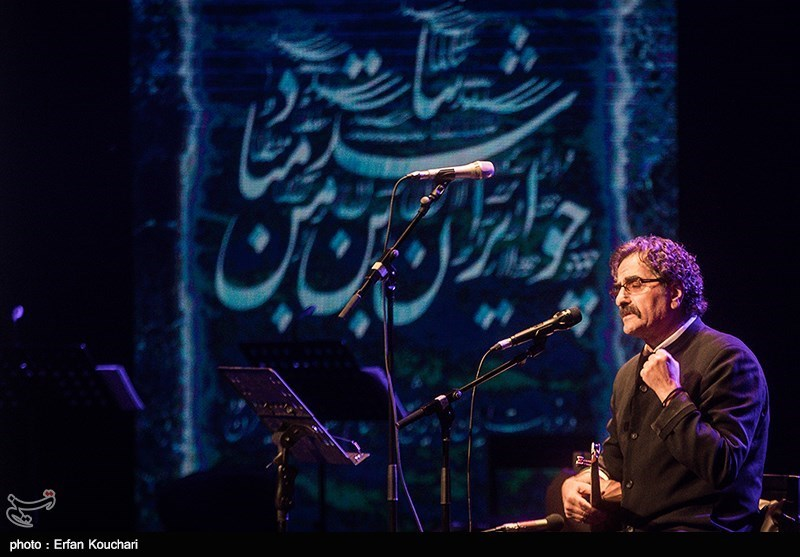
Shahram Nazeri Playing the Setar & Singing

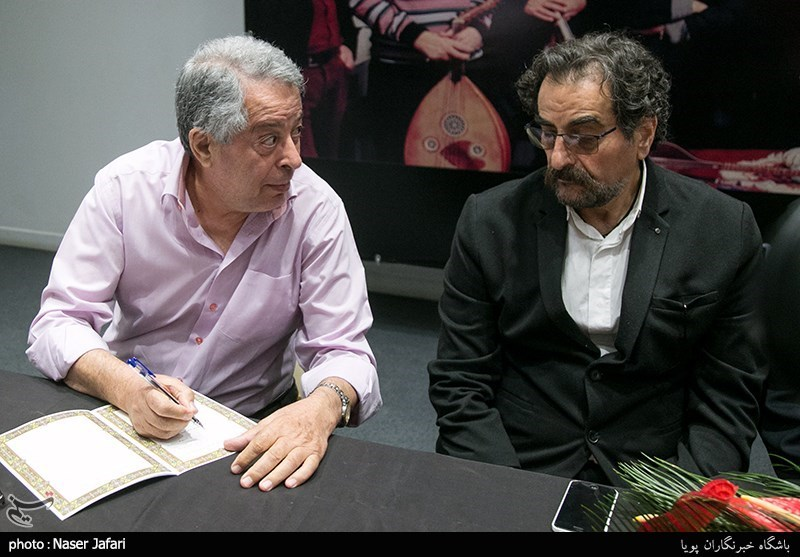
Shahram Nazeri & Hooshang Kamkar

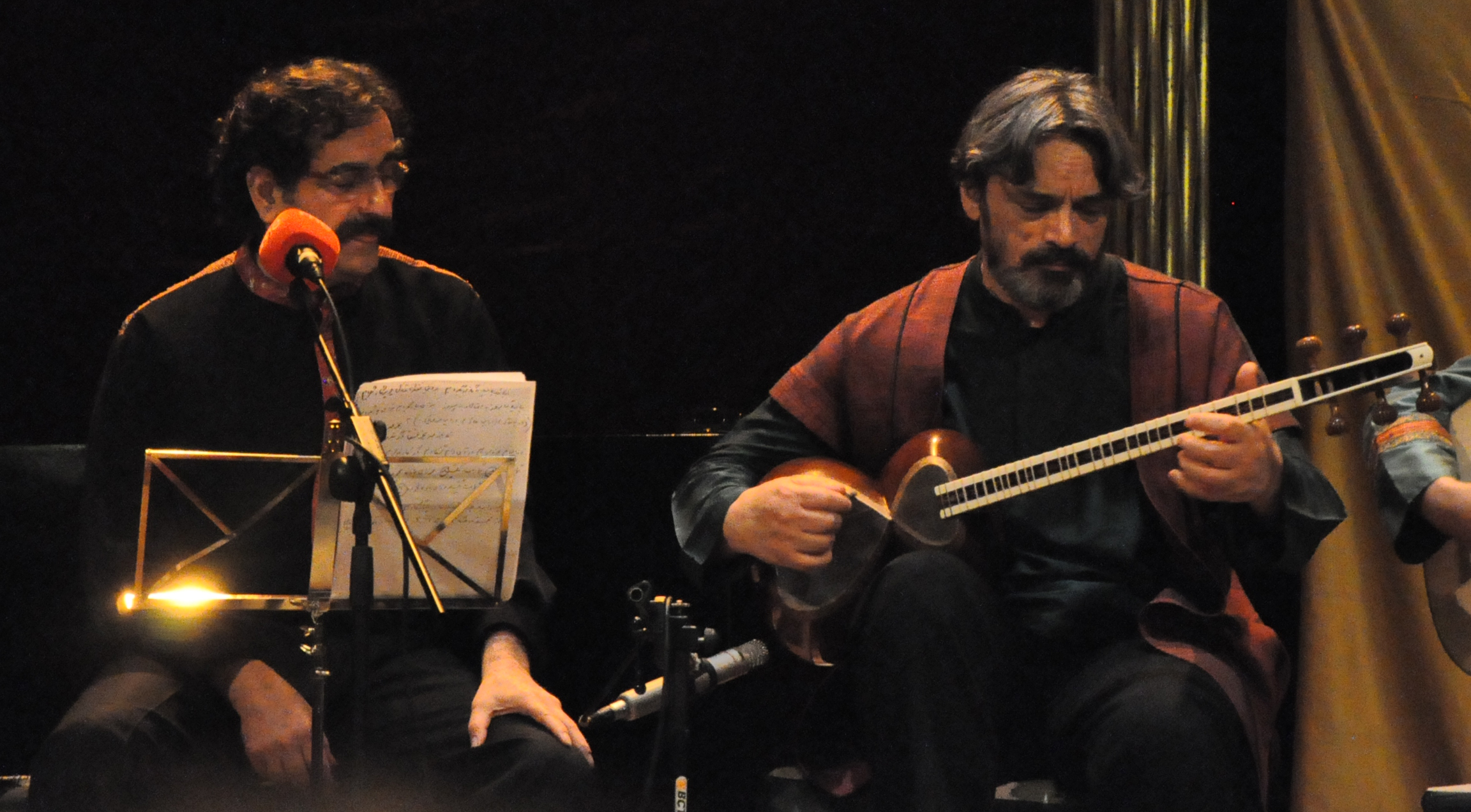
Shahram Nazeri & Hossein Alizadeh, Madrid (2011)

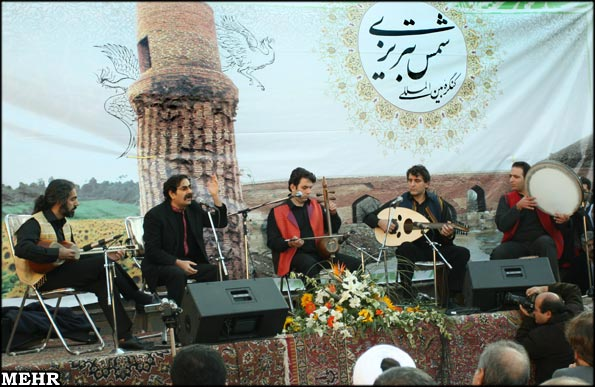

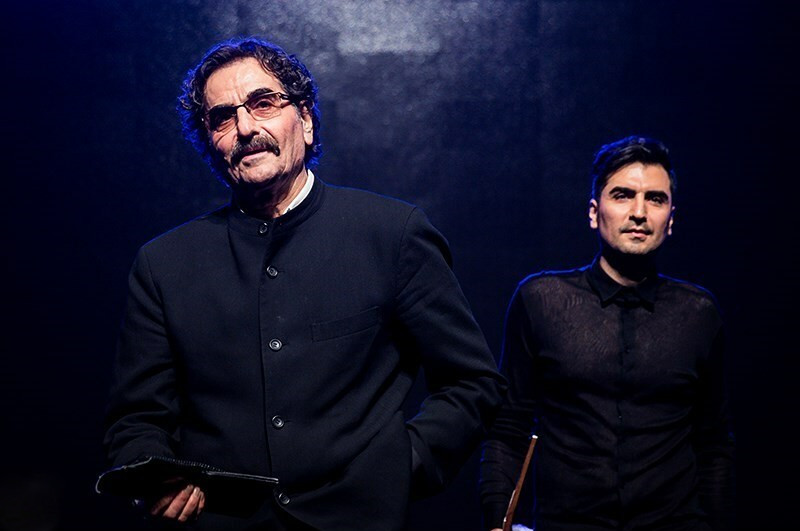
Shahram Nazeri & Hafez Nazeri Concert

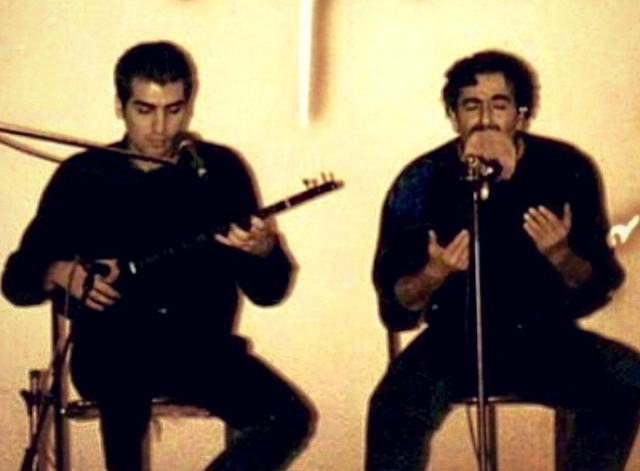
Shahram Nazeri & Hafez Nazeri, 2001

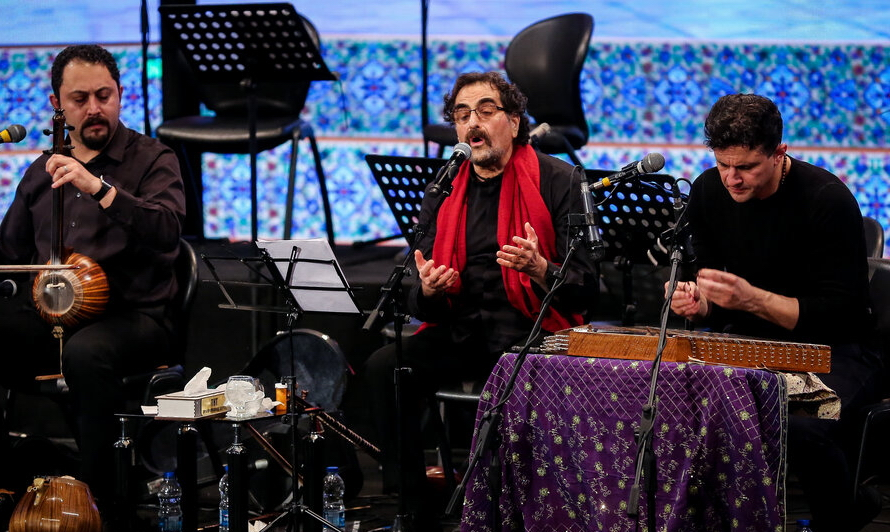
Shahram Nazeri & Pejman Taheri, 2019

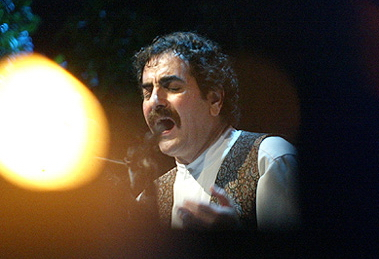
Shahram Nazeri, 2005

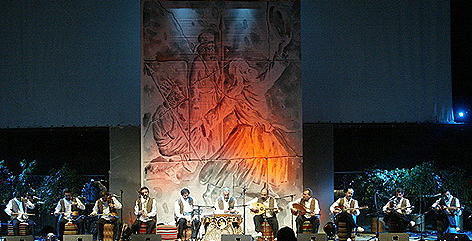
Shahram Nazeri & Parviz Meshkatian

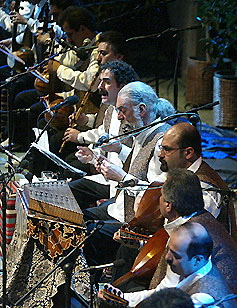
Shahram Nazeri & Parviz Meshkatian

== See also ==
- Aref Ensemble
- Dastan Ensemble
- The Kamkars
- Shams Ensemble
