= Jalil Shahnaz =

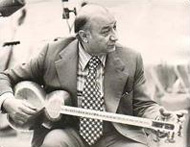

Background information
- Born: 22 May 1921; Isfahan, Persia (Iran)
- Died: 17 June 2013 (aged 92) Tehran, Iran
- Genres: Persian classical music
- Occupation: Professional musician
- Instrument: Tar

Jalil Shahnaz (22 May 1921 – 17 June 2013; Persian: جلیل شهناز) was a Persian classical music musician and a virtuoso tar player.

== Biography ==
Jalil Shahnaz was born in 1921 in Isfahan, Persia (Iran). Shahnaz studied with his brother, Hossein Shahnaz, and befriended Hassan Kassai, a ney player.

According to the book Persian Musicians by Pejman Akbarzadeh:

"Shahnaz started his activities in 1949 at Radio Isfahan and in 1957 he was invited to cooperate with Radio Tehran. In the capital he worked as a soloist at ''Golha program'' and was later active at the Shiraz/Persepolis Arts Festival. Shahnaz in the late 1980s became a member of "Persian Music Maestros Ensemble".

The ensemble performed various concerts inside and outside of Iran."

Persian classical vocalist Mohammad-Reza Shajarian named his most recent musical group "Shahnaz" in honor of Maestro Shahnaz.

Shahnaz died in Tehran on 17 June 2013.

== Works ==
- "Atr Afshan" (tar solo, accompanied by Mohammad Esmaeili, tombak).
- "Zaban-e tar" (tar solo, accompanied by Jahangir Malek, tombak).
- "15 Pieces for Tar and Setar" (transcribed by Houshang Zarif). Soroud Publications, Tehran, 2000.

== See also ==
- Persian classical music
- Music of Iran
- List of Iranian musicians
