= Iraj Bastami =

- Born: November 22, 1957; Bam, Iran
- Died: December 26, 2003 (aged 46) Bam, Iran
- Genre: Classical Music
- Occupations: Singer, Composer
- Years active: 1987 – 2003

Iraj Bastami (Persian: ایرج بسطامی) (November 22, 1957 – December 26, 2003) was a Persian classical musician and vocalist. Bastami died in the Bam earthquake.

== Discography ==
=== Studio albums ===
Some of his known works include:

- Mojdeye Bahar
- Afshari Morakkab
- Rast Panjgah Concert
- Ofoghe Mehr
- Vatane Man
- Khazan va Arezou
- Bedahehkhani va Bedahehnavazi
- Bouye Norouz
- Sokout
- Zohour
- Khaneh Bouye Gol Gereft
- Moseme Gol
- Bi Karevane Koli
- Raghse Ashofteh
- Hale Ashofteh
- Fasaneh
