= Parviz Meshkatian =

Iranian composer and musician (1955–2009)

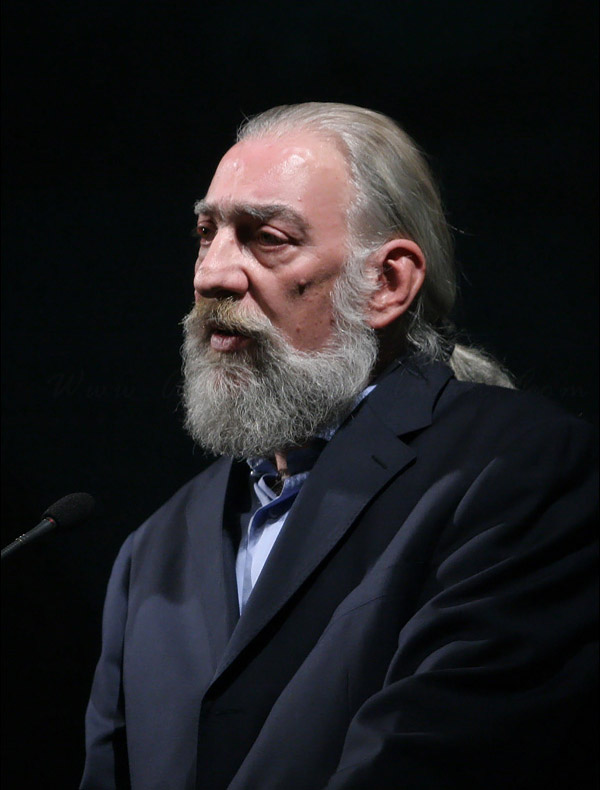

Background information
- Born: 15 May 1955; Nishapur, Imperial Iran
- Died: 21 September 2009 (aged 54) Tehran, Iran
- Genres: Persian music
- Occupations: Composer, Santur player
- Instruments: Santur, Setar
- Years active: 1977–2009

Parviz Meshkatian (Persian: پرويز مشكاتيان; 15 May 1955 – 21 September 2009) was an Iranian musician, composer, researcher and university lecturer.

== Biography ==
Born in Neyshabur, Meshkatian entered the Tehran Academy of Arts, where he studied music theory and was introduced to radif (the Persian classical music repertoire) by the masters Nur-Ali Boroumand, Dariush Safvat, Mohammad Taghi Massoudieh, and Mehdi Barkeshli. He focused on the radif of Mirza Abdollah for santur and setar.

In 1977, Meshkatian cofounded the Aref Ensemble.

Meshkatian toured Europe and Asia and regularly performed. In the spring of 1982 he published the book Twenty Pieces for Santour. While continuing his work as a composer and a researcher, Meshkatian was teaching music at Tehran University.

Meshkatian died from a heart attack in Tehran on 21 September 2009.

== Discography ==
year	Album	as Composer	as Player	Singer(s)	Publisher	Description
1978	Chavoosh 4	YES	YES	Hengameh Ahavan/ Shahram Nazeri	Chavoosh	Collaboration with Mohammadreza Lotfi, Sheida and Aaref Group
1979	Chavoosh 6	YES	YES	Mohammadreza Shajarian	Chavoosh	Collaboration with Mohammadreza Lotfi, Sheida Group
1979	Chavoosh 7	YES	YES	Mohammadreza Shajarian Shahram Nazeri	Chavoosh	Collaboration with Mohammadreza Lotfi, Sheida Group
1980	Chavoosh 12	YES	YES	-	Chavoosh	Duet Collaboration with master Tonbak Player Naser Farhang Far
1981	Azarestoon	YES	YES	Mohammadreza Shajarian	-	Private Session Include Ney Player: Mohammad Musavi
1985	‌Bidad	YES	YES	Mohammadreza Shajarian	DelAvaz	--
1985	Astan-e-Janan	YES	YES	Mohammadreza Shajarian	DelAvaz	Live Concert in Italy Embassy featuring Master Tonbak Player: Naser Farhang Far
1986	Ser-e-Eshgh	YES	YES	Mohammadreza Shajarian	DelAvaz	Featuring Master Ney player: Mohammad Mousavi
1986	Lale- Bahar	YES	YES	Shahram Nazeri	---	Including Aref Group
1986	NAVA	YES	YES	Mohammadreza Shajarian	Delavaz	Including Aref Group
1988	Dastan	YES	YES	Mohammadreza Shajarian	Delavaz	Including Aref Group
1989	Doud-E-Oud	YES	YES	Mohammadreza Shajarian	Delavaz	featuring Master Mohammadreza Darvishi for Orchestration
1989	Afshari-Morakkab	YES	YES	Iraj bastami	CharBagh	Concert tour in Europe
1990	Ofogh-e-Mehr	YES	YES	Iraj bastami	Soroush	Including Aref Group
Adding Soon...						

== Gallery ==
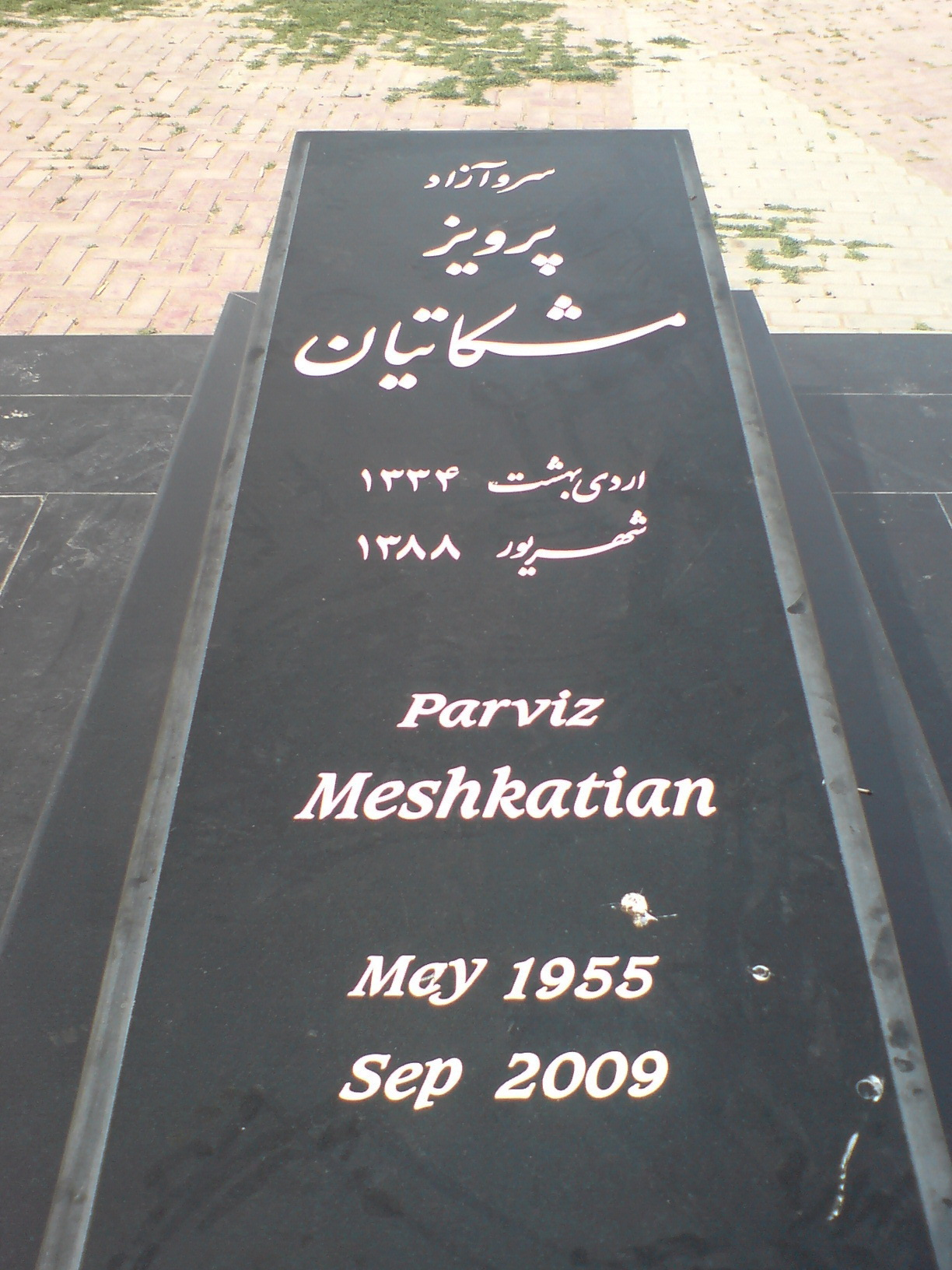
Grave of Mastro Parviz Meshkatian

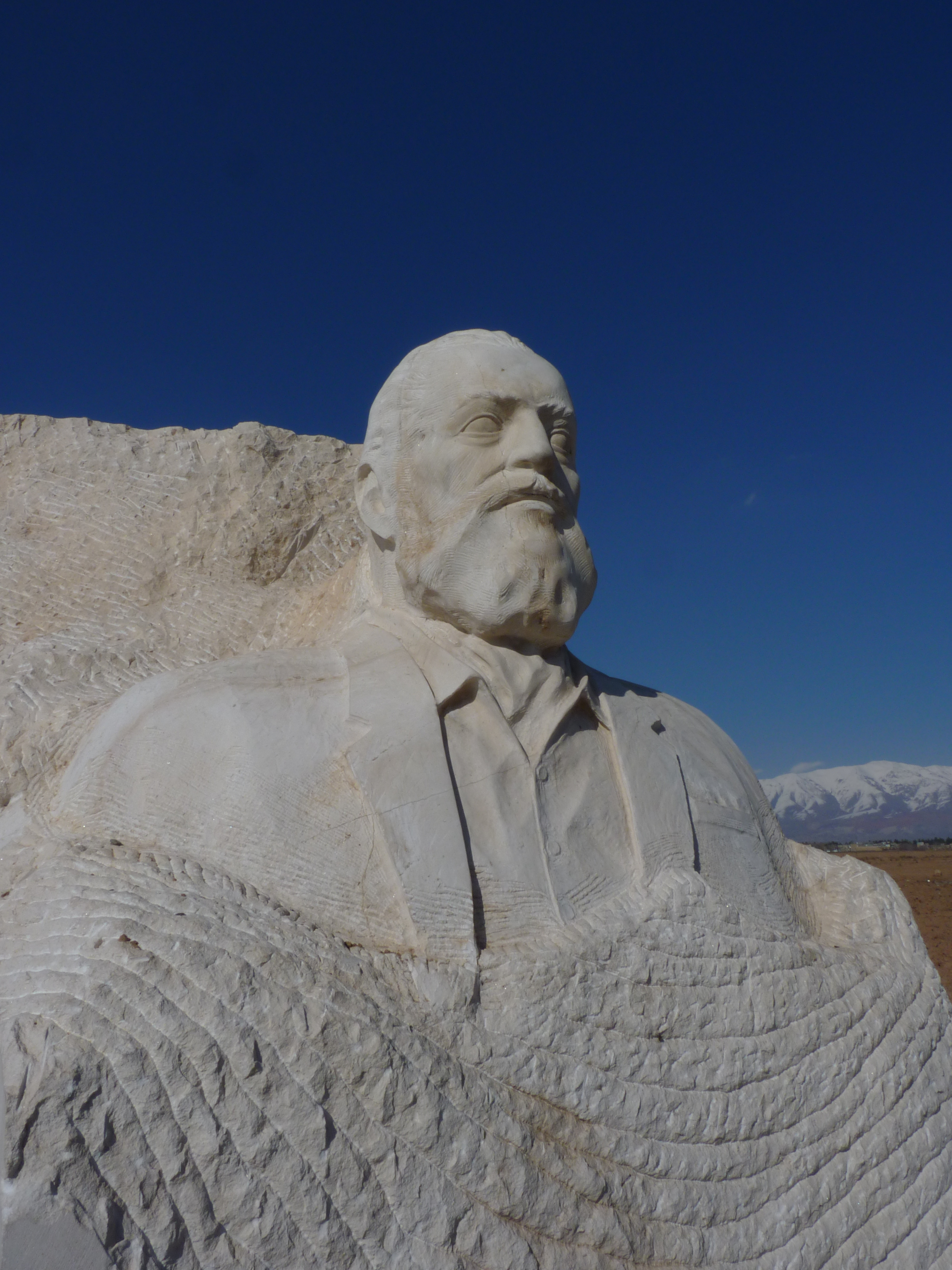
Statue of Meshkatian

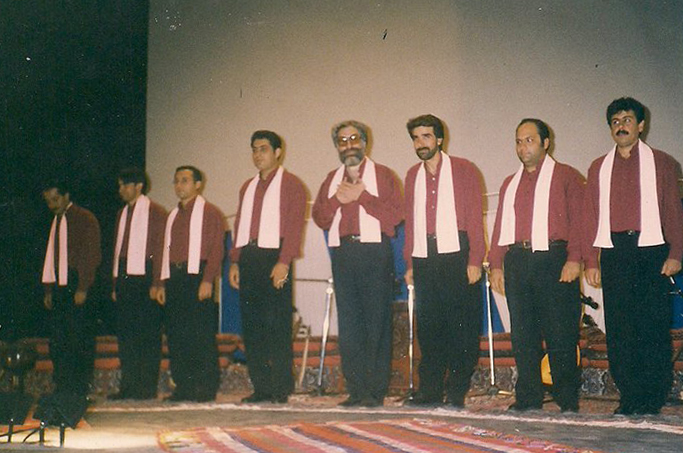
Concert in 1998

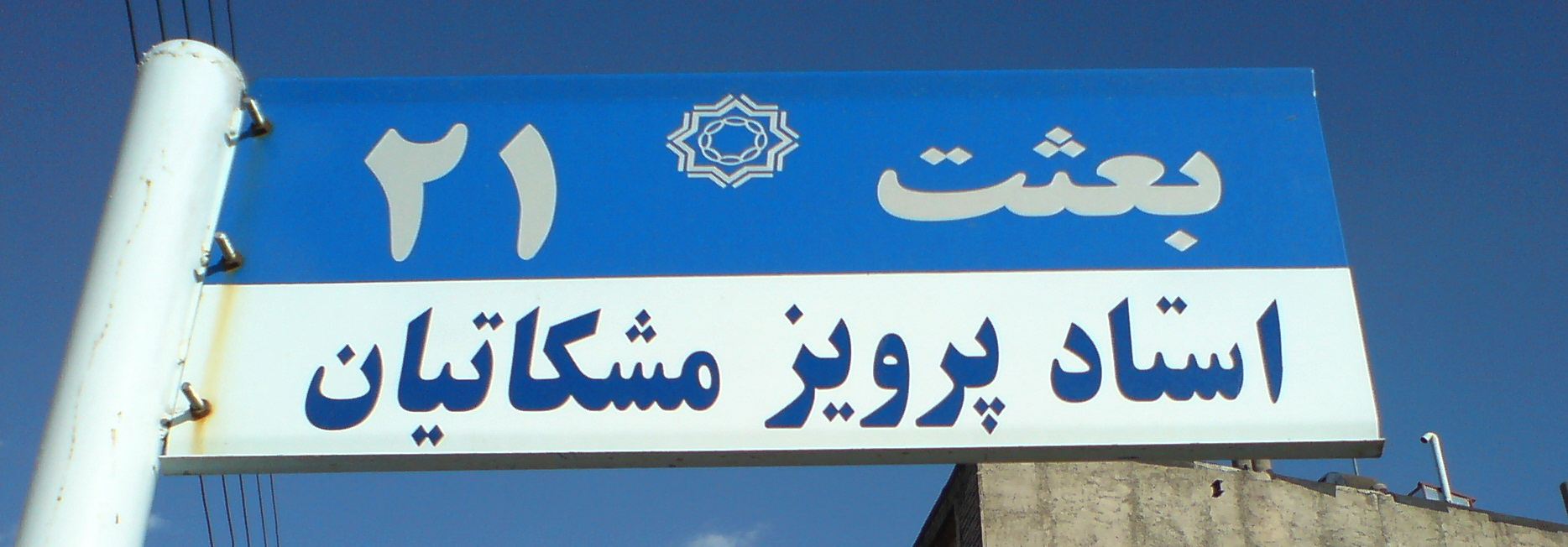
Street named parviz Meshkatian
