= Sohrab Pournazeri =

Iranian-Kurd musician and composer

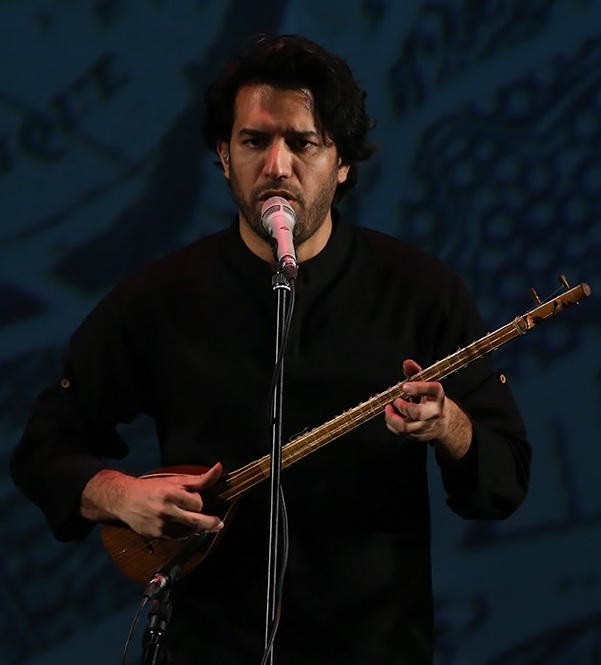

Background information
- Born: Kermanshah
- Genres: Kurdish and Persian Classical Music
- Occupations: Musician, Composer
- Instruments: Kamancheh, Tanbour, Setar
- Years active: 1997–present
- Website: Sohrab Pournazeri Official

Sohrab Pournazeri is an Iranian musician and composer. He plays Kamancheh and Tanbour.

== Career ==
Sohrab Pournazeri, born in 1983, is a musician who plays Tanbour, Kamancheh, and Setar.

Sohrab is the son of Kaykhosro Pournazeri, He joined Shamss Ensemble at the age of twelve, and since then, he has been collaborating with many musicians worldwide.

As a composer, he has composed for Iranian singers such as Mohammad Reza Shajarian, Homayoun Shajarian, Alireza Ghorbani.

In 2026, he became a member of the Recording Academy, the organization behind the Grammy Awards.

On 15 February 2026, in light of the 2025–2026 Iranian protests, Pournazeri was briefly arrested and had his passport seized, reportedly for posts on his Instagram page related to the protests.

== Soundtrack Composition ==
- Single Mum directed by Saeed Zamanian 2026
- 1001 Nights directed by Mostafa Kiaei 2025
- Flaming directed by Hamid Nematollah 2018
- Subdued directed by Hamid Nematollah 2015
- Heavy Makeup directed by Hamid Nematollah 2014
- Astigmatism directed by Majid-Reza Mostafavi 2018
- Vaziat-e Sefid directed by Hamid Nematollah 2012
- Penniless directed by Hamid Nematollah 2009

== Discography ==
Albums
Album	Released	Composer	Singer	Tracks
Colors Of Transcendence	-	Tahmoures Pournazeri, Sohrab Pournazeri	MohammadReza Shajarian	
Iran	2018	Sohrab Pournazeri	Homayoun Shajarian	14
Subdue	2017	Sohrab Pournazeri	Homayoun Shajarian	12
Kobane	2016	Sohrab Pournazeri	Donya Kamali	10
Heavy Makeup	2016	Sohrab Pournazeri	Homayoun Shajarian	10
The Lords of the Secrets	2015	Sohrab Pournazeri	Homayoun Shajarian	8
Gypsy Wind	2015	Sohrab Pournazeri, Rubik Arutzian	-	4
Raindrops	2014	Kaykhosro Pournazeri, Tahmoures Pournazeri,Sohrab Pournazri	Alireza Ghorbani	12
Nishtiman	2013	Sohrab Pournazeri	Maryam Ebrahimpour	10
Tanbours Chant	2012	Kaykhosro Pournazeri, Tahmoures Pournazeri,Sohrab Pournazri	Alireza Ghorbani	14
Hidden in Heart	2012	Kaykhosro Pournazeri, Tahmoures Pournazeri, Sohrab Pournazeri	Hamidreza Norbakhsh	11

== Live Performances ==
- 2025: "Afsaneh" performance at the Tanweer Festival with Kaykhosro Pournazeri and Sahar Boroujerdi in Sharjah
- 2025: "Cisad Show - Gaat" Europe Tour (Stockholm, Copenhagen, Zurich, Vienna, Munich, Frankfurt, Amsterdam, Berlin)
- 2025: "Cisad Show - Gaat" Australia Tour (Sydney, Melbourne, Perth, Brisbane)
- 2025: "Cisad Show - Gaat" USA Tour (Chicago, Dallas, Houston, Seattle, San Jose, Los Angeles, Washington D.C., Boston, New York)
- 2025: "Return of the Masters" Nowruz Concert with Pacific Symphony Orchestra led by Carl St. Clair at the Renée and Henry Segerstrom Concert Hall in Costa Mesa
- 2025: "Cisad Show - Gaat" Canada Tour (Montreal, Toronto, Vancouver)
- 2024: "Cisad Show - Gaat" at Sadabad Complex
- 2024: 14th Annual Celebration of Nowruz at UCLA represented by Farhang Foundation and Herp Alpert School of Music featuring Tahmoures Pournazeri, Shahab Paranj, Hila Plitmann, Sahar Boroujerdi and the Iranshahr Orchestra with music composed by Richard Danielpour, David Garner, Ahmad Pejman, Reza Vali
- 2024: "Dar Havaye Bi Chegoonegi" Europe Tour with Ali Ghamsari
- 2024: "Dar Havaye Bi Chegoonegi" Iran Tour with Ali Ghamsari
- 2023: "Dar Havaye Bi Chegoonegi" performance with Ali Ghamsari at Sa'dabad Complex
- 2023: "Diār" performance at the UCLA Herb Alpert School of Music with Shahab Paranj, Pejman Haddadi
- 2023: Persian Classical Music at Flanagan Chapel Hall with Shahab Paranj, Portland, United States
- 2023: Songs of Love and Loss at Colburn School of Music with Shahab Paranj, Hila Plitmann and the Iranshahr Orchestra, Los Angeles, California
- 2022: Sohrab Pournazeri & Sahar Boroujerdi at Queen Elizabeth Hall
- 2022: "300 Show" at Sa'dabad Complex
- 2021: Sohrab Pournazeri and Sahar Boroujerdi at Pierre Boulez Saal
- 2021: Festival International de Musique Nouvelle en Franche Comtè at Château de Ray-sur-Saône, France
- 2021: Sohrab Pournazeri and Ernest Production at Les Dominicains de Haute-Alsace, France
- 2020: Shamss Ensemble and Homayoun Shajarian at Theatre de la Ville, Paris, France
- 2020: Bozar Music Festival, Shamss Ensemble and Homayoun Shajarian at Palais des Beaux-Arts, Brussels, Belgium
- 2019: Iran-e Man Concert Tour in Canada (Toronto Meridian Hall, L’Olympia de Montréal, Queen Elizabeth Theatre, Jack Singer Concert Hall)
- 2019: Iran-e Man Concert Tour in Europe (Gothenburg Concert Hall, Stockholm Concert Hall, Central Hall, The Plaza, Großer Sendesaal des Hessischen Rundfunks, Capitol Theater)
- 2019: Iran-e Man Concert Tour in USA (City National Civic, Warner Theater, Cullen Performance Hall, Microsoft Theater)
- 2019: Farhang Foundation Nowruz Concert (Homayoun Shajarian, Sohrab Pournazeri and Pacific Symphony)
- 2019: Sohrab Pournazeri & Homayoun Sakhi at Theatre de la Ville, Paris, France
- 2018: Homayoun Shajarian, Tahmoures & Sohrab Pournazeri at Cemal Reşit Rey (CRR) Concert Hall, Istanbul, Turkey
- 2018: Shamss Ensemble at FEZ Music Festival, Jnan sbil, Fes, Morocco
- 2018: Shamss Ensemble at Konya Mystic Music Festival, Konya, Turkey
- 2018: Iran-e Man Concert Tour in Canada (Palais des congrès de Montréal, Sony Centre for the Performing Arts – Meridian Hall, Queen Elizabeth Theatre, Arts Commons)
- 2017: Iran-e Man Concert Tour in Iran (Ministry of Interior Hall)
- 2017: C Project (30 Nights at Sa'dabad Complex)
- 2017: Performance at Au Fil Des Voix with Nishtiman Ensemble
- 2016: Forde Festival with Nishtiman Ensemble
- 2011: USA tour with Shams Ensemble
- 2010: Omar Khayyám project with Alireza Ghorbani, Dorsaf Hamdani and Ali Ghamsari
