= Amir Pourkhalaji =

Amir Pourkhalaji امیر پورخلجی
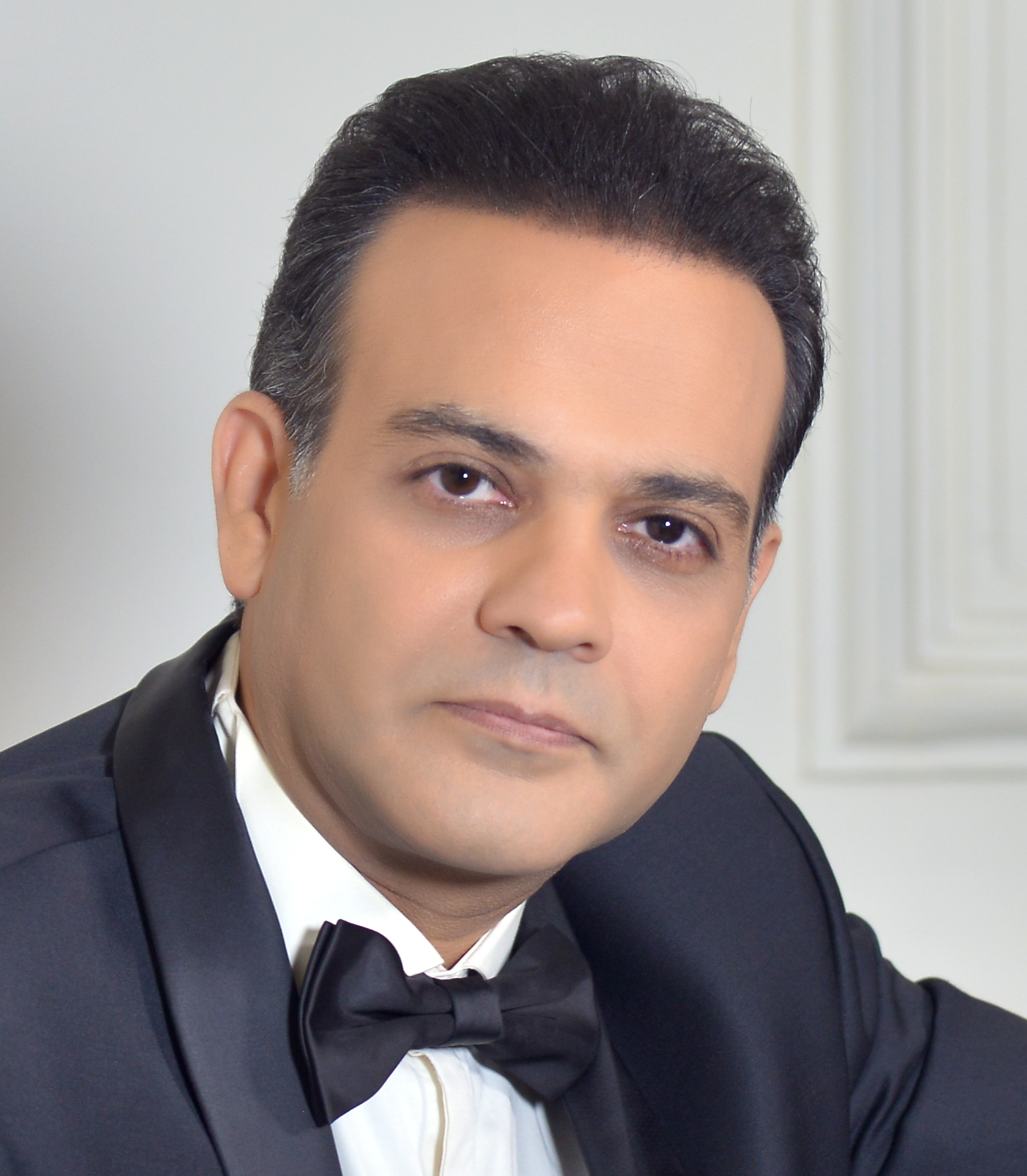
- Pourkhalaji in 2024

Background information
- Born: 9 January 1983 (age 43); Tehran
- Origin: Iranian
- Genres: Classical music, Persian symphonic music
- Occupation: Composer
- Instrument: Violin
- Website: amirpourkhalaji.com

Amir Pourkhalaji (Persian: امیر پورخلجی) (born 9 January 1983) is an Iranian music composer and conductor.

== Early life ==
He was born in 1983 in Tehran, Iran. He took up music as a child, playing the violin. After completing his undergraduate studies, he entered the University of Art, where he graduated with a master's degree in composition in 2009.

== Musical career ==
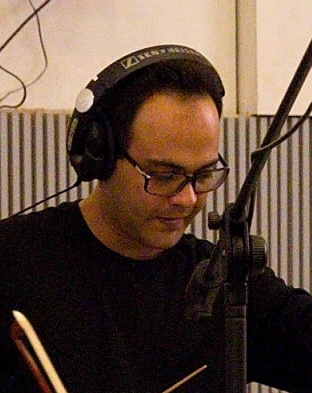
Pourkhalaji in 2016

Pourkhalaji has composed works for contemporary orchestral and film music. He has collaborated with several orchestras, including the National Orchestra of Iran, the National Symphony Orchestra of Ukraine, the Prague Metropolitan Symphony Orchestra, the Rousse Philharmonic Orchestra, and the Tehran Symphony Orchestra. His works have been performed at international festivals such as the Tirgan Festival in Canada and the Fajr Music Festival in Iran, where he received the Barbad Award for Best Composer in 2021.

His orchestral compositions include Arash the Archer Suite, Hafez Opera, and Twelve Faces Battle, which integrate Persian musical elements with large-scale symphonic structures. In addition to orchestral music, he has composed film scores for short films and animations such as "Light Sight", "One Person", and "Crab", which have received recognition at international festivals.

== Discography ==
Year	Album title	Genre	Composer	Conductor	Performed by	Recorded at/in	Published by
2024	Arash the Archer	Persian symphonic music	Amir Pourkhalaji	Volodymyr Sirenko	National Symphony Orchestra of Ukraine	Ukraine (Kiev – 2009)	Global Digital Platforms
2024	Gisu Boran	Persian classical music	Amir Pourkhalaji	–	Amir Pourkhalaji	2024	Global Digital Platforms
2021	Hafez (opera)	Persian symphonic music	Amir Pourkhalaji	Amir Pourkhalaji	Vocal: Alireza Ghorbani, Ali Zand Vakili, Sahar Mohammadi and …	2012	Neydavood
2021	Iranian New Waves	Contemporary music	This album is a collection of new works for solo flute by distinguished Iranian composers who have significantly influenced the development of contemporary concert music in Iran.	–	Flute: Kelariz Keshavarz	2020-2021	Petrichor Records in US
2017	Ashegh Kist (Who is in love)	Persian symphonic music (based on Abu Sa'id Abu'l-Khayr poems)	Amir Pourkhalaji	Amir Pourkhalaji	Vocal: Shahram Nazeri Prague Metropolitan Symphony Orchestra	Czech TV Music Studio-2016	Pardis Records
2015	Creation (Creation Symphonic Suite & Twelve Faces Battle)	Persian symphonic music (based on Shahnameh (Epic of Kings) of Ferdowsi)	Amir Pourkhalaji	Amir Pourkhalaji	Rousse Philharmonic Orchestra	Rousse Philharmonic Hall (Bulgaria)	Pardis Records
2015	Eyes Shut	Minimal – New-age music	Amir Pourkhalaji	–	Piano: Amir Pourkhalaji	–	Hermes Records

== Concert ==
The National Orchestra of Iran performed Rostamzad, composed and conducted by Amir Pourkhalaji and narrated by Baran Nikrah, over two nights at Vahdat Hall 29 and 30, 2025.

The ballet Arash the Archer, composed by Amir Pourkhalaji, was performed by the Iranian National Ballet Company and choreographed by Nima Kian at the Tirgan Festival in Toronto, Canada (August 2015).

The world concert tour of Mohammad-Reza Shajarian visited Europe, the United States, and Canada, with orchestral arrangements by Amir Pourkhalaji and David Garner.

== Movies ==
- Musical arrangement for Aquatic 2023 short film/animation directed by Shiva Sadegh Asadi
- Musical arrangement for Stain 2022 Short film/Animation directed by Shiva Sadegh Asadi

== Books ==
- Twelve Etudes for Viola (2022 – Nayoney Publication)
- Thirty Etudes for Viola (2024 – Nayoney Publication)

== Awards and nominations ==
- Winner of the Barbad Award for Best Composer in the Contemporary Orchestral Music category, 36th International Fajr Music Festival (Iran, 2021)
- Award winner, best original score "One Person" (Nahal International Short Film Festival, 2019)
