= Barbad Award =

Trophy awarded in Fajr Music Festival

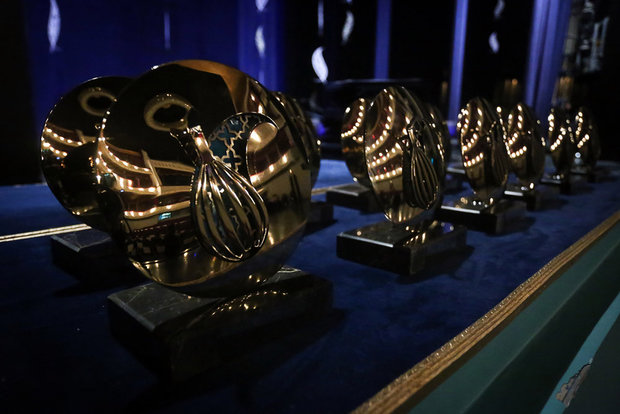
- Barbad award
- Country: Iran
- First award: 2016–Present
- Website: fajrmusicfestival.com/en/

Barbad Award (Persian: جایزه باربد, romanized: Jāyeze-ye Bārbad) is a statue awarded to the winners of the competitive section of Iran's most prestigious music festival, the Fajr International Music Festival. This award was added to the festival from the 31st Fajr International Music Festival.

== Winners ==
=== 31st Fajr International Music Festival (2016) ===
- Ardeshir Kamkar
- Alireza Ghorbani
- Hooshang Kamkar
- Tahmoures Pournazeri
- Homayoun Shajarian
- Amin Honarmand
- Shahrdad Rohani
- Siavash Roshan
- Darkoob Band
- Chaartaar
- Behrouz Saffarian
- Sohrab Mohammadi

=== 32nd Fajr International Music Festival (2017) ===
- Navid Dehghan
- Mehdi Shahsavar
- Behzad Ravaghi
- Shervin Mohajer
- Mahyar Alizadeh
- Peyman Soltani
- Alireza Mashayekhi
- Hamzeh Yeganeh
- Ashkan Maheri
- Mohsen Chavoshi
- Reza Aryaee
- Mahbod Shafinejad
- Alireza Ghorbani
- Homayoun Shajarian

=== 33rd Fajr International Music Festival (2018) ===
- Majid Mowlania
- Ghasem Rahimzadeh
- Karen Keyhani
- Alireza Mashayekhi
- Milad Derakhshani
- Golnoosh Salehi
- Mehdi Yarrahi
- Kaveh Yaghmaei
- Reza Aryaee
- Kaveh Salehi
- Alireza Ghorbani

=== 36th Fajr International Music Festival (2021) ===
- Kaveh Mirhosseini
- Hamzeh Moghaddam
- Abolhasan khoshroo
- Houshmand Ebadi
- Bahman Faryadras
- Mojtaba Asgari
- Mostafa Ghanaat
- Damahi Band
- Pouya Kolahi
- Amir Pourkhalaji
- Vahid Taj
- Mahour (Label)
