= Beyond Any Form =

Studio album by Homayoun Shajarian and Tahmoures Pournazeri
- Released: March 11, 2014 (Iran); March 31, 2014 (Worldwide)
- Recorded: 2011–2014: Fantasy Studios (Berkeley); Rusl Studio (Los Angeles); MDM Studio (Istanbul); Shamss Studio (Tehran); Studio Bell (Tehran)
- Genres: Persian traditional music, World music
- Length: 47:54
- Labels: Mystic World Music (Worldwide), Irangam (Iran)
- Producer: Sadroddin Hosseinkhani

Homayoun Shajarian chronology
Simorgh (2012)	Beyond Any Form (2014)

Tahmoures Pournazeri chronology
Afsaneh Sho (2013)	Beyond Any Form (2014)

Alternative cover

Beyond Any Form (Persian: نه فرشته‌ام نه شیطان; lit. I am neither Angel nor Devil) is a collaborative studio album by Persian traditional musicians Homayoun Shajarian and Tahmoures Pournazeri, as vocalist and composer respectively.

The album was unveiled on March 11, 2014, in a ceremony held in Vahdat Hall.

Beyond Any Form includes eight songs in Persian language based on lyrics from renowned Persian classical poet Mowlana Jalaleddin Rumi and contemporary poets Shafiei Kadkani, Simin Behbahani and Hossein Monzavi.

Composer Tahmoures Pournazeri describes the album as an "Iranian contemporary music" album, lacking Radif and inspired by classical, Tanbur, Flamenco and Kurdish music.

The 5th track, is based on a melody from Paco de Lucía and the 7th track is played improvisationally.

The album also features American composer David K. Garner, Indian Sitar virtuoso Shujaat Khan, Venezuelan flautist Pedro Eustache and American blues guitarist Jimmy Johnson.

Beyond Any Form was among the best-selling albums in Iran.

A music video of Why Did You Leave Me? was directed by Baran Kosari for the unveiling ceremony, featuring a number of Iranian actors, including Sahar Dolatshahi, Navid Mohammadzadeh and Mehrdad Sedighian among others.

== Track listing ==
Beyond Any Form
No.	Title	Lyrics	Length
1.	"Why Did You Leave Me?" (Chera Rafti?)	Simin Behbahani	5:20
2.	"Inside The Mirror" (Daroun-e Ayeneh)	Hossein Monzavi	6:10
3.	"Heart to Heart" (Del Be Del)	Houman Zokaei	5:36
4.	"The Gypsy" (Koli)	Simin Behbahani	5:07
5.	"Beyond Any Form" (Hameh Hicham)	Hossein Monzavi	5:38
6.	"Without Me" (Chouni Bi Man?)	Rumi	7:33
7.	"Splash" (Shatak)	Hossein Monzavi	5:23
8.	"In The Prison of Night" (Dar Hesar-e Shab)	Mohammad-Reza Shafiei Kadkani	7:24
Total length:			47:54

== Personnel ==
Credits are adapted from Beyond Any Form liner notes.

- Homayoun Shajarian – vocals
- Tahmoures Pournazeri – composer, recording supervisor, photographer, setar (track 1–5, 7–8), barbat (track 3, 6), daf (track 3)

Additional musicians

- David Garner – arrangement
- Ramón Stagnaro – guitar (track 8)
- Sohrab Pournazeri – kamancheh (track 3, 6, 8)
- Jimmy Johnson – bass (track 5, 8)
- Shujaat Khan – sitar (track 6)
- Pedro Eustache – duduk (track 6)
- Hamidreza Taghavi – santour (track 8)
- John Wakefield – percussion (track 5–8)
- Shahab Paranj – kouzeh & kick (track 8)
- Mehmet Akatai – darbuka, bendir (track 3)
- Mahyar Torayhi – santour (track 3)
- Kaveh Grayeli – setar (track 3)
- Philip Brezina – violin (track 1, 6)
- Stephanie Bibbu – violin (track 1, 6)
- David Ryther – violin (track 1, 6)
- Peter Masek – violin (track 1, 6)
- Jory Fankuchen – violin (track 1, 6)
- Natalie Carducci – violin (track 1, 6)
- Noemy Lafrenais – violin (track 1, 6)
- Evan Buttemer – viola (track 1)
- Nils Bultman – viola (track 1)
- Cilo Tilton – viola (track 1)
- Elizabeth Chio – viola (track 1)
- Andrei Gorbatenko – bass (track 1)
- Alden Cohen – bass (track 1)
- Seth Osborn – piano (track 1)
- Roshanak Kaymanesh – chor (track 1)
- Samira Mohseni – chor (track 1)
- Shuin Corrasco – cello (track 1, 6)
- Joanne De Mars – cello (track 1, 6)

Artistic personnel

- Pouneh Mirlou – graphic design and illustration
- Neda Moradi – illustrator
- Arash Gharighi – photographer
- Behrouz Badiei – photographer
- Hananeh Tabatabaei – photographer
- Soroush Payandeh – photographer

Technical personnel

- Sadroddin Hosseinkhani – producer
- Mehdi Beshkoufeh – associate producer
- Adam Monuz – sound engineer
- Jesse Nichols – sound engineer
- Alberto Hernandez – sound engineer
- Jill Tengan – sound engineer
- Omid Nikbin – sound engineer
- Reza Sadeghi – mixing
