= Safarzadeh =

Safarzadeh is a surname. Notable people with the surname include:

- Abouzar Safarzadeh (born 1995), Iranian footballer
- Hajar Safarzadeh (born 2000), Iranian para-athlete
- Jamshid Safarzadeh (born 1982), Iranian santur player and composer
- Mehrdad Safarzadeh (born 1962), Iranian former cyclist
- Saeid Safarzadeh (born 1985), Iranian cyclist
- Siamak Safarzadeh (born 1964), Iranian former cyclist
