= Shamss Ensemble =

Iranian musical group

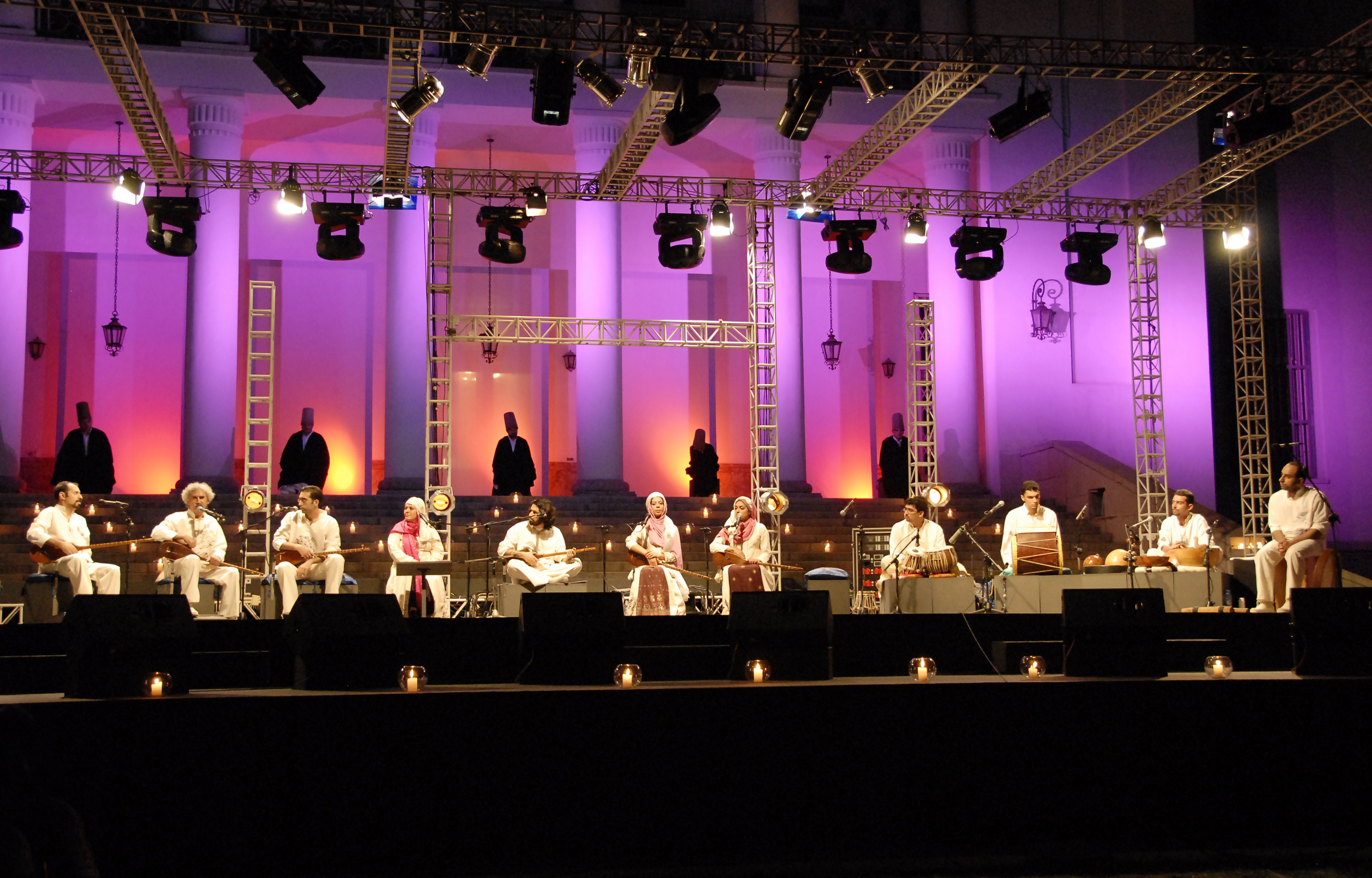

Background information
- Origin: Iran
- Genres: Persian traditional music
- Instrument: Tanbour
- Years active: Since 1980
- Members: Kaykhosro Pournazeri, Tahmoures Pournazeri, Sohrab Pournazeri

The Shamss Ensemble (Persian: گروه شمس) is a musical group that performs traditional Sufi and classical Iranian music with the Tanbour, Daf (frame drum), Ney and various other percussion instruments. The group was founded by composer Kaykhosro Pournazeri. His sons Tahmoures and Sohrab are also members of the group.

== History ==
Pournazeri formed the Shamss Ensemble with a vision of bringing back the lost art of Tanbour through compositions that fused the Tanbour with other traditional classical mode instruments.

He invited fellow musicians who were familiar playing such classical pieces, they eventually became a popular musical ensemble in Iran. Initially, the group performed under the name of Tanbour-e-Shams, but adding traditional and Kurdish music to their performances, they took the name of the Shamss Ensemble.

The Shamss Ensemble has performed at over 300 international venues and was on tour in the United States in 2008 during the month of October.

== Members ==
Over the years, there have been more than fifty players and singers, the majority of whom were Pournazeri's students. After the 1979 Islamic Revolution in Iran, women were banned from performing solo in front of men—that includes singing or playing any instruments. Only recently, women have been included as vocalists and players of the Tanbour.

== Albums ==
Albums
Album	Released	Composer	Singer	Tracks
Whirl of Divinity	2018	Kaykhosro Pournazeri	-	
Raindrops	2014	Kaykhosro Pournazeri, Tahmoures Pournazeri, Sohrab Pournazeri	Alireza Ghorbani	12
Tanbours Chant	2012	Kaykhosro Pournazeri, Tahmoures Pournazeri, Sohrab Pournazeri	Alireza Ghorbani	14
Hidden in Heart	2012	Kaykhosro Pournazeri, Tahmoures Pournazeri, Sohrab Pournazeri	Hamidreza Norbakhsh	11
Motreb-e Mahtab Rou	2007	Kaykhosro Pournazeri	Shahram Nazeri	6
Nishtiman	2001	Kaykhosro Pournazeri	Najmeh Tajadod, Maryam Ebrahimpour, Neda Khaki	8
Legend of Tanbour	2001	Kaykhosro Pournazeri	Shahram Nazeri	8
Mastan	1999	Kaykhosro Pournazeri, Tahmoures Pournazeri	Bijan Kamkar, Najmeh Tajadod, Maryam Ebrahimpour	7
Heyrani (Perplexity)	1996	Kaykhosro Pournazeri	Shahram Nazeri	6
Voice of Endearment	1983	Kaykhosro Pournazeri	Shahram Nazeri	6

== Live performances ==
- 2020: Shamss Ensemble and Homayoun Shajarian at Theatre de la Ville, Paris, France
- 2020: Bozar Music Festival, Shamss Ensemble and Homayoun Shajarian at Palais des Beaux-Arts, Brussels, Belgium
- 2018: Shamss Ensemble at FEZ Music Festival, Jnan sbil, Fes, Morocco
- 2018: Shamss Ensemble at Konya Mystic Music Festival, Konya, Turkey

== See also ==
Music of Iran
