= Tahmoures Pournazeri =

Iranian musical artist

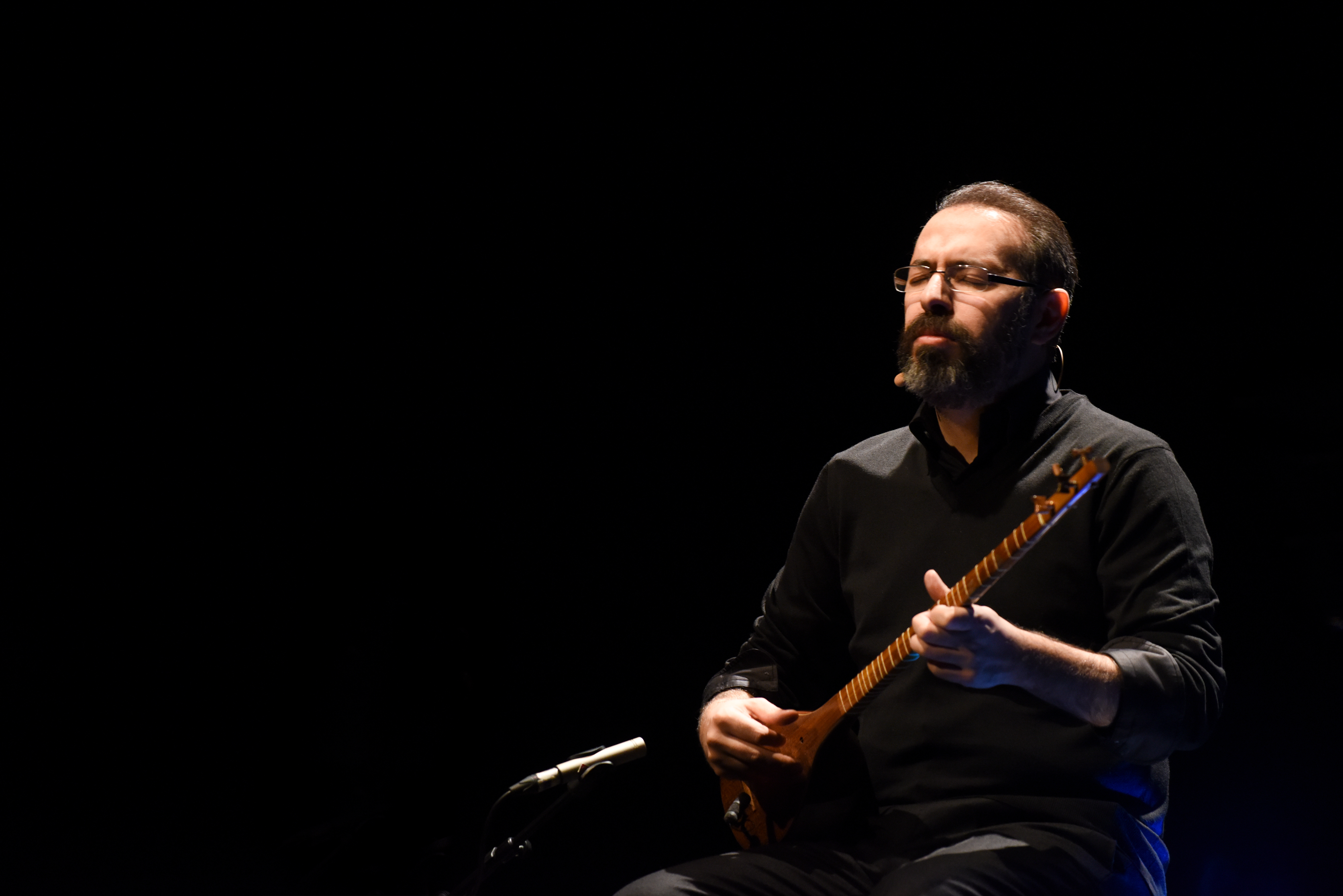

Background information
- Also known as: Tamoures
- Born: Tahmoures Pournazeri; 8 February 1977 (age 49); Kermanshah, Iran
- Origin: Kermanshah, Iran
- Genre: Iranian traditional music
- Occupations: Musician & composer
- Years active: 1989–present
- Member of: Shamss Ensemble
- Website: tamoures.com

Tahmoures Pournazeri (Persian: تهمورس پورناظری; born 8 February 1977) is an Iranian multi-instrumentalist and Iranian traditional musician. He is a member of Shamss Ensemble since 1989, along with his father Kaykhosro Pournazeri and his brother Sohrab pournazeri.

He has been acclaimed by the U.S. Senate for composing music for the International Norooz Celebration, and collaborated with artists like Joan Baez, Shujaat Hussain Khan, and the great master Mohammad Reza Shajarian. He has composed for fifteen albums covering six genres of music, participated in the Avignon Festival at the age of 15, won first honors among Young Iranian Talents at age 14, and performed with the Shams Ensemble at Iran's most celebrated concert halls starting at age 12.

== Early Age ==
Tahmoures was born in February 1977 to the musical Pournazeri family. His father Kaykhosro Pournazeri is known as the father of Sufi music and of the Tanboor, his grandfather Haji Khan was a distinguished Tar player.

== Career ==
Tahmoures' knowledge in the fields of Iranian tribal and traditional music, as well as western-style composition, has allowed him to create a new and original style – which is considered a great accomplishment in Eastern music.

Along with his father Kaykhosro and his brother Sohrab, Tahmoures leads and directs the Shamss Ensemble – considered one of Iran's foremost musical groups. He plays all the major Iranian instruments, concentrating especially on the Tar, Setar, Tanboor, Barbat, and Daf – and has experimented with and composed for new instruments designed by Mohammad Reza Shajarian.

Tahmoures continues to compose in the fields of mystical music, modern Iranian classical music, Kurdish music, symphonic orchestral music, and modern fusion. He also has extensive experience in the field of music recording.

His cooperation with Homayoun Shajarian, the celebrated Iranian singer, has led to a best-selling album, ‘Beyond Any Form’, and the highest-grossing concert tour in the history of Iranian music, with a total audience of over 120,000. The album also features Sohrab Pournazeri on the Kamancheh, American composer David K. Garner, Indian Sitar virtuoso Shujaat Khan, Venezuelan flutist Pedro Eustache, and American blues guitarist Jimmy Johnson.

He performed at NPR with Mohammadreza Shajarian and Sohrab Pournazeri.

Tahmouras Pournazeri was about to perform the “Baz Amadam” concert, with Sahar Mohammadi Boroujerdi, which can be considered as a performance-concert, in July 2023 at Sa'adabad Complex in Tehran. The music of this performance was based on traditional Iranian music, tanbour music and contemporary Persian music, combined with classical and electronic music. And the story of each song was about to perform by a dance group named "Harkat". But the concert canceled because the Iranian government forbidden Tahmoures to perform with a female singer and a dance group contain female dancers. And he announced that he will not run the show without his female members.

== Discography ==
Albums
Album	Released	Composer	Singer	Tracks
Colors of Transcendence	-	Tahmoures Pournazeri	MohammadReza Shajarian	
Tanblues	1399	Tahmoures Pournazeri	Josette Bushell-Mingo	7
Tanbours Chant	1393	Kaykhosro Pournazeri, Tahmoures Pournazeri, Sohrab Pournazeri	Alireza Ghorbani	14
Raindrops	1393	Kaykhosro Pournazeri, Tahmoures Pournazeri, Sohrab Pournazeri	Alireza Ghorbani	12
Beyond Any Form	1392	Tahmoures Pournazeri	Homayoun Shajarian	8
Become A Fable	1389	Tahmoures Pournazeri	Sohrab Pournazri	8
The Land of Sun	1388	Tahmoures Pournazeri	Farshad Jamali	11
Hidden in Heart	1386	Kaykhosro Pournazeri, Tahmoures Pournazeri, Sohrab Pournazeri	Hamidreza Norbakhsh	11
The Land of Love	1384	Tahmoures Pournazeri	Farshad Jamali	10
Sewi Sour	1377	Tahmoures Pournazeri	Bijan Kamkar	8

== Concerts ==
- "300 Show" at Sa'dabad Complex
- Shamss Ensemble, Kaykhosro Pournazeri, Homayoun Shajarian, Feb 7, 2020, Brussels, Palais des Beaux-Arts - BOZAR
- Shamss Ensemble, Kaykhosro Pournazeri, Homayoun Shajarian, 8, Feb 9, 2020, Theatre de la Ville, Espace Cardin, Paris
- Iran-e Man Concert Tour - Europe, Gothenburg, Sweden, Manchester, London, Frankfort, Düsseldorf (2019)
- Shamss Ensemble, Kaykhosro Pournazeri, Homayoun Shajarian, Sep 30, 2018, Konya Mystic Music Festival, Melvina Cultural Center
- Homayoun Shajarian, Sohrab and Tahmoures Pournazeri, Dec 4, 2018, Cemal Reşit Rey (CRR) Concert Hall, Istanbul
