= Jamshid Safarzadeh =

Jamshid Safarzadeh جمشید صفرزاده
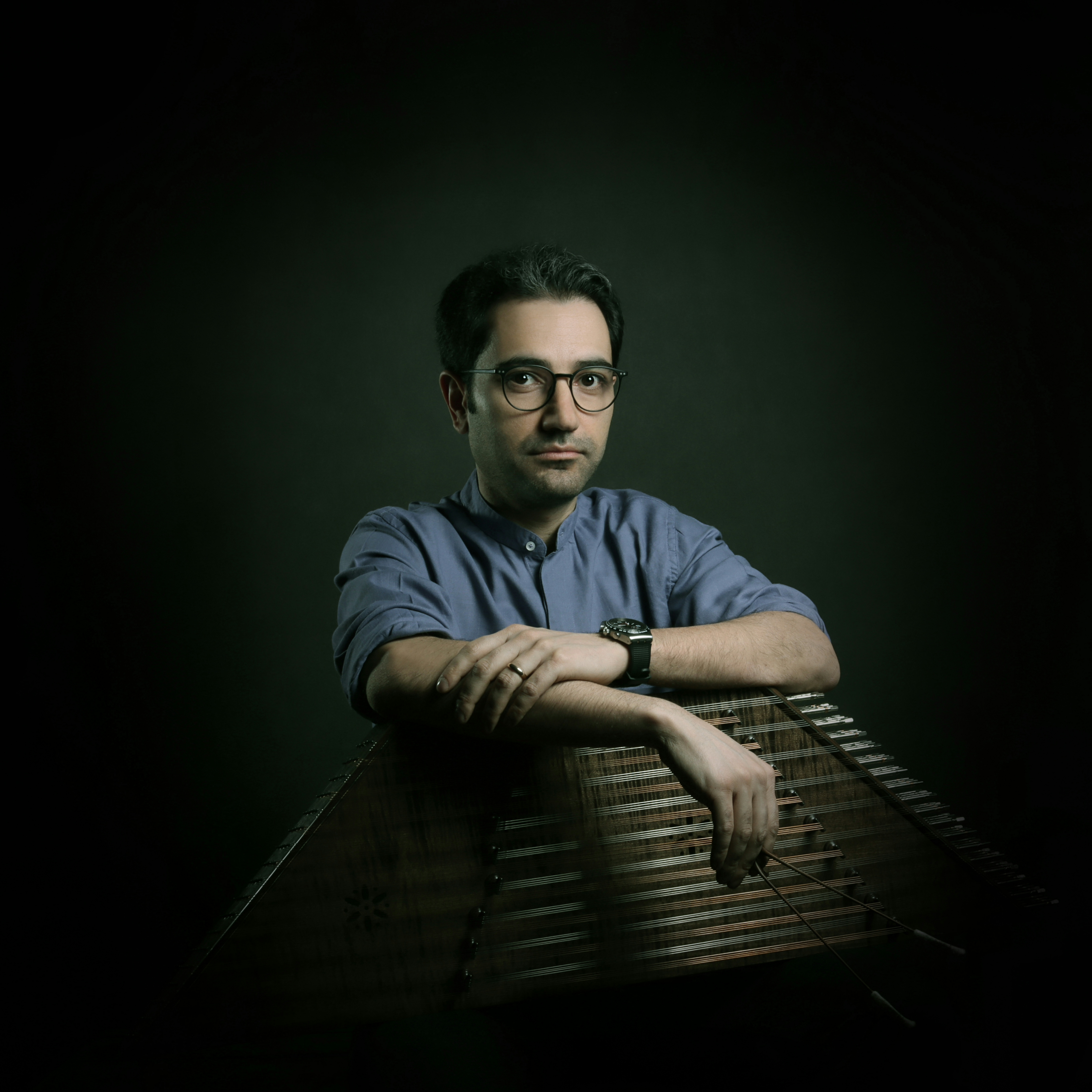
- Jamshid Safarzadeh in 2024

Background information
- Born: 26 July 1982 (age 43); Tehran, Iran
- Genres: Traditional music; Persian the national music
- Occupations: Composer and player
- Instrument: Santur
- Years active: 2005–present

Jamshid Safarzadeh (Persian: جمشید صفرزاده; born 26 July 1982) is an Iranian Santur player and music composer recognized for his collaborations with various ensembles and artists within traditional Persian music; He has been a member of the Shahnaz music Ensemble as a santur player. In 2017, He was nominated for Best Composition at the 33rd Barbad Award Festival for his album "The era of love" (دوران عشق). He graduated with a Bachelor of Arts in music from Azad University in Tehran and has performed internationally.

== Education ==
Safarzadeh graduated with a Bachelor of Arts in music from Azad University in Tehran.

== Musical career ==
Safarzadeh is known for his Santur playing and has collaborated with several ensembles, including the Shahnaz Ensemble. He has performed alongside esteemed artists, such as Mohammadreza Shajarian and Majid Derakhshani. Additionally, he has worked with the Molavi Ensemble, led by vocalist Shahram Nazeri, participating in multiple concert tours.

== Concerts ==
- Collaboration with the "Shahnaz Music Ensemble" sung by Master Mohammad-Reza Shajarian and supervised by Master Majid Derakhshani tours in the Europe in 2011, 2012, and 2014, as well as in the United States (2012) and Australia (2013); and the UK concert tour at the Barbican Hall in 2011, the Royal Festival Hall in 2012, and the Albert Hall in 2014.
- Commemoration of Rumi in Turkey, the Beit Al-Din Festival in Lebanon, the Dubai concert, and the European concert tour in 2014.
- Collaboration with the "Molavi Ensemble" sung by Master Shahram Nazeri on numerous concert tours within Iran.
- In 2016, Safarzadeh founded the Soor Ensemble with Majid Molania. The ensemble has performed in multiple countries, including Sweden, Indonesia, Greece, Romania, Austria, Afghanistan, Germany, Belarus, and Nigeria. During a European tour, the Soor Ensemble featured the Persian vocalist Salar Aghili.
- He has also performed concerts with the Mah Ensemble under the leadership of Majid Derakhshani, including a European tour in 2019 featuring vocalist Sahar Zibaei, an Australian tour in 2014, a European tour in 2013 with vocalist Mahdieh Mohammadkhani, and a European tour in 2023 with Vahid Taj. Moreover, he is set to perform a concert at the Aga Khan Museum in Toronto in 2024.
- He has performed at the 2017 Berlin Women's Voice Festival and the 2024 Denmark Music Festival.
- He has held prestigious concerts at Iran's Unity Hall.

== Song Albums ==
=== Composition ===
Year	Title	Composer	Dulcimer player	Singer	Publisher	Ref
2018	Sleepless eye (چشم بی خواب)	No	Yes	Hesamoddin Seraj	Nofeh publishing	
2017	The era of love (دوران عشق)	Yes	Yes	Salar Aghili	Avay Barbad Company	
2017	Wandering soul (جان سرگردان)	Yes	Yes	Salar Aghili	Irangam Company	
2016	You should live in love (در عشق زنده باید)	No	Yes	Vahid Taj	Rozhin Music Company	
2013	Dude drunk (یار مست)	No	Yes	Salar Aghili	Irangam Company	
2012	Pure moment (لحظه ناب)	No	Yes	Hossein Reza Asadi	Irangam Company	

== Awards and nominations ==
Award	Year	Category	Nominated Work	Result	Ref
33rd Barbad Award Festival	2017	Instrumental music with words (composition)	The era of love (دوران عشق)	Nominated	
The Voice of Solidarity Festival	2005	Solo Performance	Solo Performance Santur (تک نوازی)	Won	
