= Hossein Monzavi =

Iranian poet

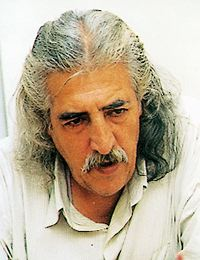
- Hossein Monzavi, Zanjan, Iran
- Born: Hossein Monzavi حسین منزوی; September 23, 1946; Zanjan, Iran
- Died: May 5, 2004 (aged 57); Tehran, Iran
- Citizenship: Iran
- Education: Bachelor of Arts
- Occupations: Poet; essayist; translator
- Children: Ghazal Monzavi
- Writing career
- Language: Persian
- Genre: Poet
- Notable awards: Forough Prize

Hossein Monzavi (Persian: حسين منزوی) (23 September 1946 in Zanjan, Iran – 5 May 2004 in Tehran) was an Iranian poet, essayist and translator who had great effects on Iranian literary mutating. Monzavi's reputation is in composing poems and his lyric poems are primarily in Persian, but he also has contributed to the Azerbaijani language.

== Life ==
He was born in Zanjan. After education and living in Tehran for some years, he came back to his hometown. His father Mohammad Monzavi was also a poet that had written some poems in the same languages that wrote imitative poetry for Mohammad-Hossein Shahriar's Heydar Babaya Salam. Homayoun Shajarian, a Persian traditional singer, has used lyrics of Hossein Monzavi in Setareh-ha (The Stars) music album. Hossein Monzavi died from Pulmonary embolism in Tehran in 2003.

== Works ==
Monzavi frequently used Azeri folklores and legends in his poems. Hossein Monzavi's famous works are:

- Translating Mohammad-Hossein Shahriar's Heydar Babaya Salam and his father's imitative poem from Azeri to Persian.
- Duman (The Fog in Azeri) is Monzavi's Azeri poems collection which had been published in Danulduzu set of series with Maftoun Amini's prefatory.
- From hemlock and sugar, Persian lyrics collection (written from 1970 to 1988)
- With love around Calamity, Persian lyrics collection (written from 1988 to 1993)
- From cashmere and lyricism, Persian lyrics selection (1997)
- With Siavash among fire
