= Shahab Paranj =

Composer

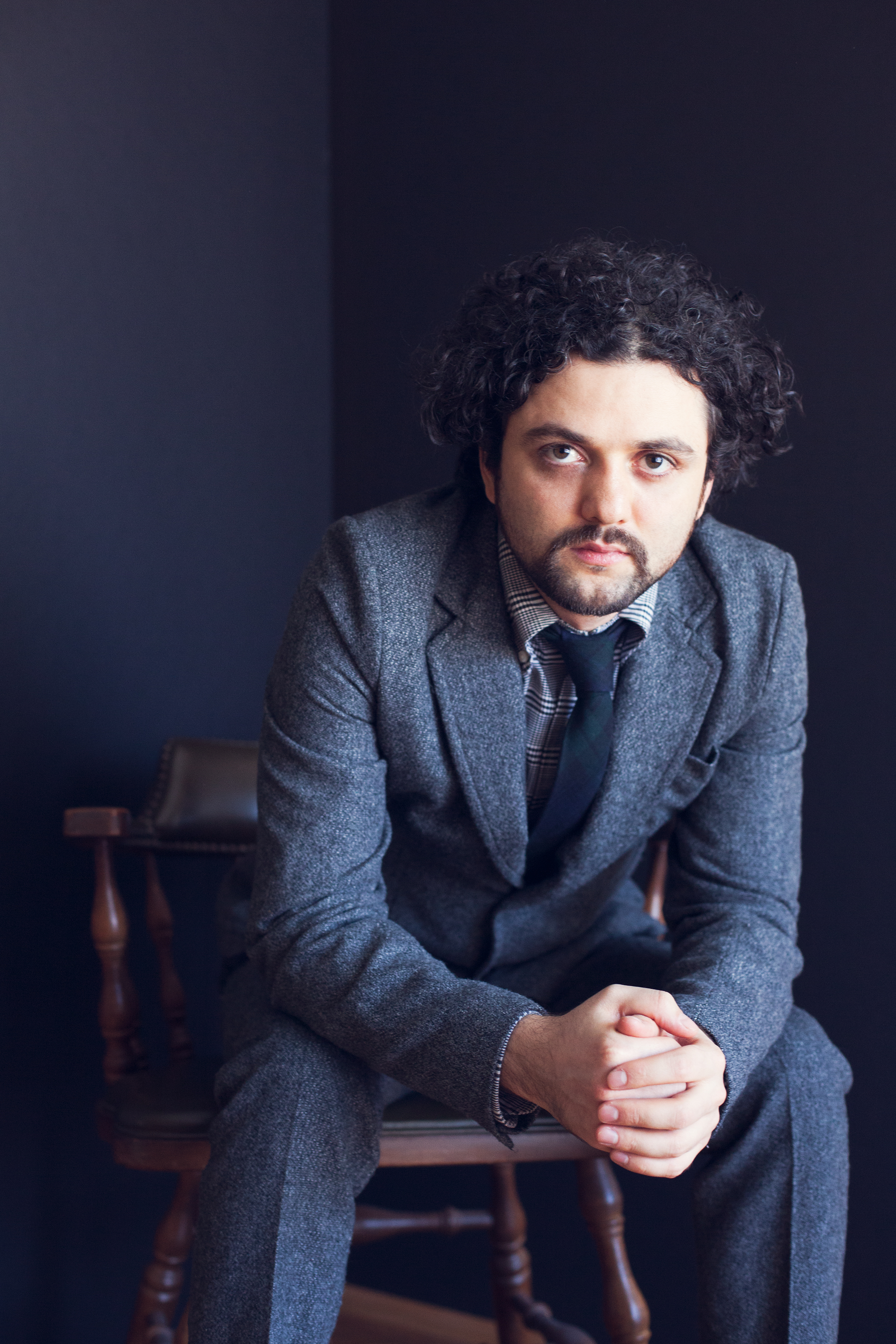
- Shahab Paranj in 2014
- Born: 1983 (age 42–43); Tehran, Iran
- Website: www.paranj.com

Dr. Shahab Paranj (Persian شهاب پارنج) (born April 17, 1983, Tehran) is an Iranian-American composer and instrumentalist based in Los Angeles. He is considered one of the pioneers among his generation of composers whose composition style integrates Persian and Western composition techniques. Known as a tombak virtuoso, he has performed, recorded and collaborated with some of the most celebrated artists worldwid! Paranj is a founder and artistic director of “Du Vert à L’infini” a contemporary music festival in the Franche-Comte region of France. He currently serves as a faculty member at the UCLA Herb Alpert School of Music.

== Education ==
Paranj received his first BM in cello performance from the Tehran School of Music and a second Bachelor's degree in classical composition from San Francisco Conservatory of Music, a Master's degree from Manhattan School of Music and his Ph.D. at the University of California, Los Angeles, under the tutelage of David Garner, Richard Danielpour, Ian Krouse and David Lefkowitz.

== Career ==
Paranj is known for championing Persian classical music and culture throughout the world. His style blends Persian rhythmic and melodic influences with Western texture and form.

A cellist and master of the tombak, he has played on more than 40 albums with musicians all over the world, appearing at more than 100 well known festivals and venues, such as Lincoln Center in New York, Théâtre de la Ville in Paris, Davies Symphony Hall in San Francisco. He has collaborated with ensembles such as Shamss Ensemble and soloists such as Persian master Mohammad-Reza Shajarian. Other accomplishments include film scores for independent film companies and a collaboration with artist Taraneh Hemami and Arash Fayez.

== List of works ==
- (2023) The Wounded Harp for string orchestra, tanbour, kamancheh and soprano! Commissioned by The Iranshahr Orchestra
- (2023) Daughter of Iran for soprano, zoorkhaneh zarb, daf and electronic
- (2022) Lullaby for clarinet and piano
- (2021) Kamantar for violin and guitar
- (2020) Avaz-jan for solo violin
- (2019) Lost in Lut for string orchestra, commissioned by Russian String Orchestra
- (2018) Bigáh for solo piano
- (2017) The Dialogue for percussion ensemble
- (2017) Original score for movie "DRESSAGE"
- (2017) Avaz-e Jan for solo cello
- (2016) The Autumn of Norooz, for orchestra
- (2016) String Quartet No. 2
- (2015) Dawar-e Charkh, guitar duo, commissioned by Sopraduo
- (2015) Elegy, for solo violin commissioned by Solenn Seguillon
- (2014) The Unattained
- (2013) Molten Brass, commissioned by ILBT
- (2013) Piano trio No. 1, commissioned by Aleron Trio
- (2013) Resistance collaboration with Taraneh Hemami
- (2012) Raghs-e Lang, for percussion ensemble
- (2010) String quartet No. 1
- (2012) Fantasy for new music ensemble
- (2011) Shoor for solo viola
- (2010) Shade for solo viola
