= Dorsaf Hamdani =

Tunisian singer and musicologist

Dorsaf Hamdani درصاف حمداني
- Origin: Tunisian
- Genres: Arab music/ World music
- Occupation: Singer

Dorsaf Hamdani (Arabic: درصاف حمداني;) is a Tunisian singer, musicologist and the JMC Director.

== Life ==
Daughter of a violinist, Hamdani joined the National Conservatory of Music in Tunis in 1985, allowing her to perform with Tunisian Malouf orchestras.

In 1994, she began her postgraduate studies, and earned a master's degree in musicology in 1998. During her student years, she participated in tours with The Rachidia. Two years later, she obtained a Master's from the Sorbonne in music and musicology.

In 2010, she took part in the creation of Ivresses, a musical work based on the poetry of Omar Khayyam, along with Iranian vocalist Alireza Ghorbani; the work was met with critical and public acclaim.

== Awards ==
Hamdani won third prize at the Festival of Arab Song in 1995 held in Jordan and the Gold Disc at the Festival of Tunisian Song in 1996. In December 2016, Hamdani opened for the third season of the Muscat Chamber Music Series.

== Discography ==
- 2011 : Ivresses – Le sacre de Khayyam avec le multi-instrumentiste iranien Alireza Ghorbani;
- 2012 : Princesses du chant arabe, reprises des titres des divas arabes : Oum Kalthoum, Fairuz et Ismahène;
- 2012 : Melos avec le percussionniste iranien Keyvan Chemirani;
- 2013 : Barbara-Fairouz avec Daniel Mille à la direction musicale.
