= Iranian Orchestra for New Music =

The Iranian Orchestra for New Music was founded by maestro Alireza Mashayekhi in 1995.

== See also ==
- Persian Symphonic Music
- Tehran Symphony Orchestra
- National Iranian Orchestra
- Melal Orchestra (Nations Symphony Orchestra)
