= Melal Orchestra =

The Melal Orchestra (Persian: ارکستر ملل, romanized: Orkestre Melal, pronounced [ˈoɾkestɾe meˈlæl]) is an orchestra founded in 2007 by Peyman Soltani in order to perform pieces of ancient Iranian musical heritage at twelve historical monuments around the world.

The main goal of the orchestra is to spread empathy, companionship, and the juxtaposition of cultures, with the slogan of peace and friendship between nations.

== See also ==
- Iran's National Orchestra
- Tehran Symphony Orchestra
- Iranian Orchestra for New Music
