= Mahyar Alizadeh =

Mahyar Alizadeh مهیار علیزاده
- Born: 1982 (age 43–44); Tehran, Iran
- Genres: Persian traditional, classical
- Occupations: Composer, singer
- Years active: 2012–present
- Website: www.mahyaralizadeh.com

Mahyar Alizadeh (Persian: مهیار علیزاده; born 5 January 1982) is an Iranian musician, composer, singer and Taar player.

After graduating from Alborz High School, he continued his career in music university and after that, decided to study in foreign universities. First he entered Komitas Conservatory in Armenia. As it influenced his passion on music as he always quotes that his career as a musician is divided in two, before Armenia and after that.

After two years studying music composition at Armenia Conservatory, he chose Vienna University as the next stop in mastering musicology. Then in 2009 he resumed recording his debut album in collaboration with Alireza Ghorbani, an album that was begun when he was in Armenia. This album, named Autumn on Fire and labelled under Avay-e Barbad production, became the best selling Persian music album in 2011–2012. These successes make Mahyar Alizadeh and Alireza Ghorbani's cooperation last till today in various albums and concerts. Among his other and recent activities are music composition for movies, TV series and animations; music composition for the album Dancing in the Flames with you cooperating with Saber Abar; and music composition for an album in which Homayoun Shajarian and Alireza Ghorbani participated together. His next album, Fairy-like Girl, which was published in 2015 / 1394 SH in cooperation with Alireza Ghorbani is one of the ten best-selling albums in Iran this year. Alizadeh is now working on several other projects with the voices of various singers such as Mehran Modiri and Mohammad Motamedi.

== Achievements ==
Mahyar Alizadeh achievements to now:

- Collaboration with Keyvan Saket as Taar player, music producer and record supervisor
- Composing and Forming Harigh-E Khazan Album featuring Alireza Ghorbani on vocals
- Composing film score (soundtrack) of "Pardeh Neshin (Persian: پرده نشین)" series singing by Alireza Ghorbani and directed by Behruz Shoaibi
- Composing film score (soundtrack) of "Angels Descend Together (Persian: فرشته ها با هم می آیند)" directed by Hamed Mohammadi, 32nd Fajr Film Festival
- Composing and Forming "Fairy-like Girl(Persian: دخت پری وار)" Album featuring Alireza Ghorbani on vocals
- Composing and Forming "Dancing in the flames with you (Persian: در شعله با تو رقصان)" Album featuring Saber Abar and Pantea Panahina on narrators
- Composing and Forming "You weren`t there (Persian: نبودی تو)" Album featuring Hadi Feizabadi on vocals
- Composing and Forming "Without Me (Persian: بی من)" Album featuring Mahyar Alizadeh on vocals
- Foundation of the Persian Contemporary Music Ensemble in Vienna.
- Recording project in Czech TV studio with Prague Metropolitan Philharmonic Orchestra (April 2014)
- Forming new Album featuring Alireza Ghorbani and Homayoun Shajarian on vocals
- Composing animation film score (soundtrack) of The Orange Tree (Derakht-e Portaghali), which was directed by Amir Houshang Moin
- Composing and Forming New Album with Fardin Khalatbari featuring Mohammad Motamedi on vocals
- Composing and Forming New Album featuring Mehran Modiri on vocals

=== Composing the orchestral album with two singers ===
Mahyar Alizadeh released another album after the successful release of his Harigh-E Khazan album. This album is a joint work between the two Iranian youth and promising singers, Alireza Ghorbani and Homayoun Shajarian.

=== Concerts ===
- Concert in Tehran, AUTUMN ON FIRE and new sounds with Alireza Ghorbani on vocals in Tehran, Iran, Vahdat Hall, in 5 nights, with Sohrab Kashef conducting, Ali Jafary-Pouyan as Concert Master ( 26–30 September 2013)
- Concert in Vienna, covering Mahyar Alizadeh's plays, performed by the Persian Contemporary Music Ensemble with Iman Khammar conducting and Andrea Purtic, Anais Hardouin-Finez and Alireza Araqhi Moqadam on vocals.
- Concert in Vienna AUTUMN ON FIRE with Alireza Ghorbani on vocals and Milena Arsovska as Soprano and Anais Hardouin-Finez as Mezzo Soprano. (1 February 2013)
- Concert in Vienna, the modern hits of Mahyar Alizadeh (6 July 2013)
- Europe tour, performing AUTUMN ON FIRE and new sounds, scheduled for November 2013 in Germany, the Netherlands, Austria, Switzerland & Sweden.
- Concert in Düsseldorf, Germany with Düsseldorf Young Philharmonic Orchestra (27 September 2014)
- The concert Dancing in the Flames with you; with Saber Abar and Pantea Panahiha as singers, and Mahyar Alizadeh as composer at the Vahdat Hall (24 July 2015 / 2 Mordad, 1394 SH)
- The concert Fairy-like Girl, with Alireza Ghorbani as singer and Mahyar Alizadeh as composer within the framework of 10 performances at the Vahdat Hall (8–12 June, 17 June, 8–10 July; 2016 / 19–23 Khordad, 28 Khordad, 18–20 Tir; 1395 SH)

=== Albums ===
- 2012 – Harigh-e Khazan (Persian: حریق خزان)
- 2014 – New album with 2 singers – Alireza ghorbani & Homayoun Shajarian – coming
- 2015 – Dancing in the flames with you (Persian: در شعله با تو رقصان)
- 2016 – Fairy Like Girl (Persian: دخت پری‌وار)
- 2017 – New Album with Fardin Khalatbari featuring Mohammad Motamedi on vocals – coming soon
- 2017 – New Album featuring Mehran Modiri on vocals – coming soon
- 2018 – You weren't there (Persian: نبودی تو)
- 2019 – Without Me (Persian: بی من)

=== Filmography ===
- 2013 – ANGELS DESCEND TOGETHER(Persian: فرشته ها با هم می آیند)
- 2014 – Behind the scene (Persian: پرده نشین – Pardeh Neshin)
- 2016 – Saffron (Persian: زعفرانی – Saffron)
- 2016 – Dorehami (Persian: دورهمی – Dorehami)

=== Soundtrack ===
==== The Hermit (Pardeh-neshin), TV series ====
The Hermit is Mahyar Alizadeh's second experience in music composition for film. The director of this series is Behrouz Shoeibi and its theme music is sung by Alireza Ghorbani.

==== Saffron, TV series ====
The series Saffron with the directorship of Hamed Mohammadi was broadcast by the IRIB TV1 in Norouz, 2016 / 1395 SH. Actors such as Mahdi Hashemi, Narges Mohammadi and Setareh Eskandari played in this series. The film score for this series was composed by Mahyar Alizadeh.

=== Theme music for TV programs ===
==== Sakene Tabaghe ye Vasat, film ====
The track "Bigharar" from the album Harigh-e Khazan was chosen as the music for the end credits of the film Sakene Tabaghe ye Vasat (Resident of the Middle Floor) directed by Shahab Hosseini.

==== Dorehami ====
This program is a performance-based show which is made up of various items including talk show, stand-up comedy, etc. The music composition for the theme song of this program is done by Mahyar Alizadeh, and the singing is done by Mehran Modiri.

=== Theater Music ===
==== They’re watching us! (Negaheman mikonand) ====
Composition of the background music for the play Negaheman mikonand, directed by Mohammadreza Asli and produced by Shahnam Shahbaz Zadehbar, is done by Mahyar Alizadeh. This piece was played at Ostad Nazerzadeh Kermani Hall in Iranshahr on Tuesday, 19 January – Friday, 12 February 2016 (Tuesday, 29 Dey – Friday, 23 Bahman, 1394 SH).

=== Animation music ===
==== The Orange Tree (Derakht-e Portaghali) ====
The animation Derakht-e Portaghali, which was directed by Amir Houshang Moin and whose film score was composed by Mahyar Alizadeh, could achieve the best animation award and the honorary diploma at the eighth animation festival and the eighteenth cinema festival.

== Judging as jury member ==
- At the thirty-first Fajr Music Festival (2015), Mahyar Alizadeh was chosen as a jury member and made criticisms and judgments about the works participating in this festival.

== Art Timeline ==
- 2012 : Release of Harigh-E Khazan album (Persian: حریق خزان)
- 2013: Composing the film score (soundtrack) of "Angels Descend Together (Persian: فرشته ها با هم می آیند)" directed by Hamed Mohammadi, 32nd Fajr Film Festival
- 2014: Composing the film score (soundtrack) of "Pardeh Neshin(Persian: پرده نشین)" series singing by Alireza Ghorbani and directed by Behruz Shoaibi
- 2015: Releasing the "Dancing in the flames with you (Persian: در شعله با تو رقصان)" album
- 2015: publication of the album "Fairy-like Girl(Persian: دخت پری وار)" album
- 2015: music composition for the show Dorehami with Mehran Modiri as singer
- 2015: the film score of the TV series Saffron, directed by Hamed Mohammadi, and background music for the credits with Mehran Modiri as singer
- 2016 : film score of the animation Derakht-e Portaghali
- 2017 : music composition and compilation album, cooperating with Fereydoun Khalatbari and with Mohammad Motamedi as singer
- 2017 : music composition and compilation album, with Mehran Modiri as singer
- 2018 : Release of You weren't there album (Persian: نبودی تو)
- 2019 : Release of Without Me album (Persian: بی من)

== Awards and honors ==
- In the fifth annual survey of The MUSICEMA – the first annual celebration of MUSICEMA– which became the largest survey of Iranian music history, Mahyar Alizadeh was selected by the experts with his first album "Harigh-e Khazan", as the best Traditional Music Album of 1391 (2012).
- The Harigh-e Khazan is the first album of Mahyar Alizadeh and is in the best-selling albums of 1391(2012).
- The film score (soundtrack) of "Pardeh Neshin" series was nominated for the best television series’ and movies’ film score (soundtrack), at the fifteenth HAFEZ-PRIZE in 1394 (2014).
- The Pardeh Neshin piece composed by Mahyar Alizadeh, won the Award of the best traditional piece out of the album on People's Choice at the third annual celebration of MUSICEMA 1394 (2015).
- The album Dancing in the Flames with you, nominee for the Barbad award for the best compilation album at the thirty-first Fajr Music Festival 1394 (2015)
