= Kaykhosro Pournazeri =

Kaykhosro Pournazeri کیخسرو پورناظری
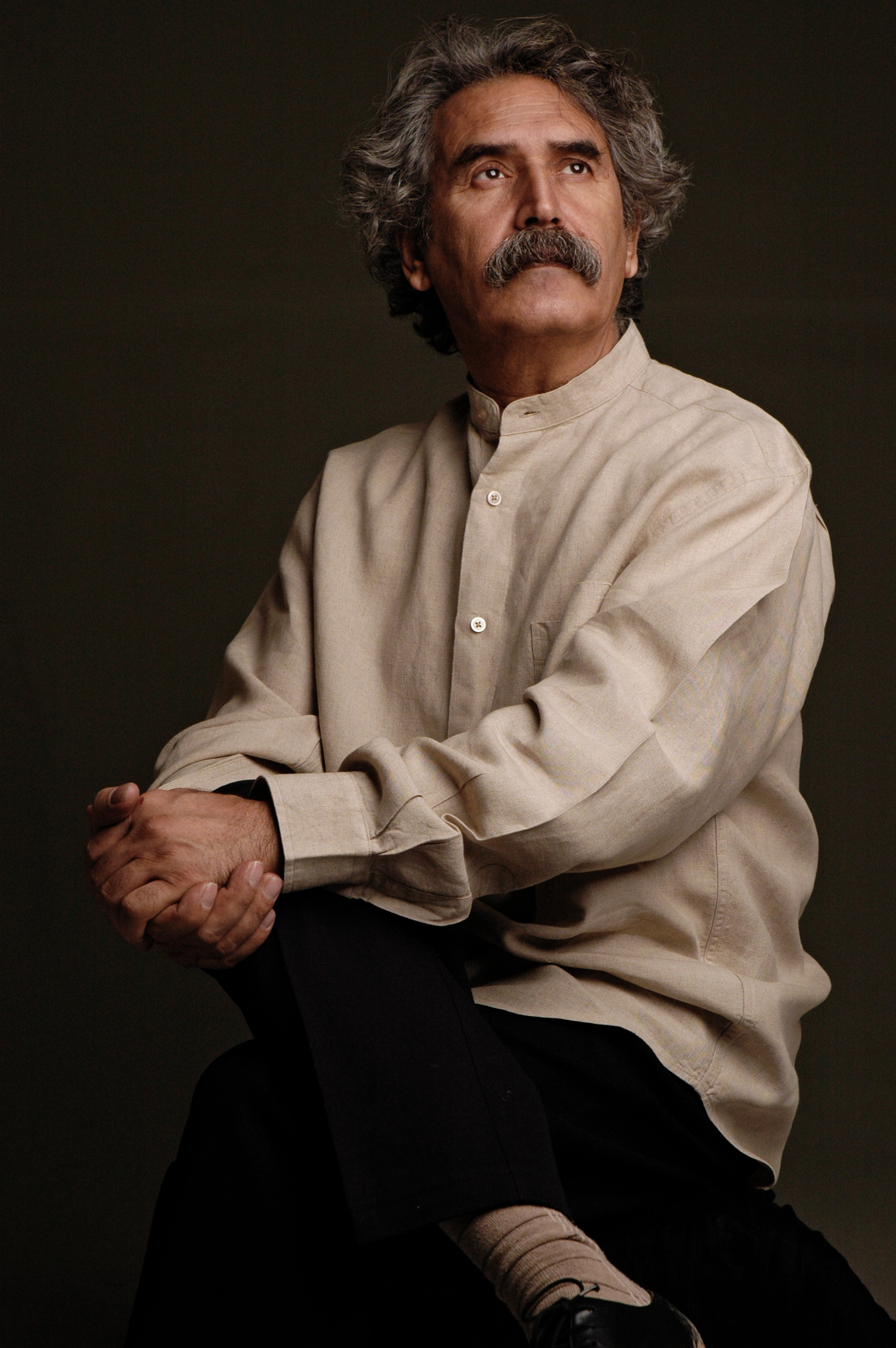

Background information
- Occupation: musician
- Member of: Shamss Ensemble

Kaykhosro Pournazeri (born in Kermanshah, Iran; 21 June 1944) is an Iranian composer and musician of Kurdish origin who plays tanbour.

== Early life ==
Kaykhosro Pournazeri was born on June 27, 1944 in the Barzeh-e-Dmagh neighborhood of Kermanshah. His father, Parviz Pournazeri, known as Haji Khan, was a student of Ali-Naqi Vaziri and Darvish Khan, and his mother, Pourandakht Sarhaddar, was the principal of Pourandakht Girls' High School in Kermanshah and the first woman to graduate in the city. Pournazeri initially studied civil engineering, but left school after three years to pursue a career in music.

== Career ==
Pournazeri began playing the tar as a child and studied radif with his father. He studied music at the College of Fine Arts at the University of Tehran and was a student of Gholamreza Dadbeh.

Pournazeri founded the Shamss Ensemble in 1980 and combined tanbour with the poetry of Rumi and the Daf frame drum. He often worked with musicians Shahram Nazeri and Seyed Jalaleddin Mohammadian. In the 1990s, Pournazeri's sons Tahmoures and Sohrab Pournazeri joined the band. The ensemble has performed more than 300 concerts inside and outside Iran. The group has also released works such as "Mastan Salamat Mekend" with the voice of Bijan Kamkar and "Panhan Cho Del" with the voice of Hamid Reza Noorbakhsh.

Pournazeri currently manages the Pournazeri Music Academy in Tehran.
