= Alireza Mashayekhi =

Iranian musician, composer and conductor

Alireza Mashayekhi علیرضا مشایخی
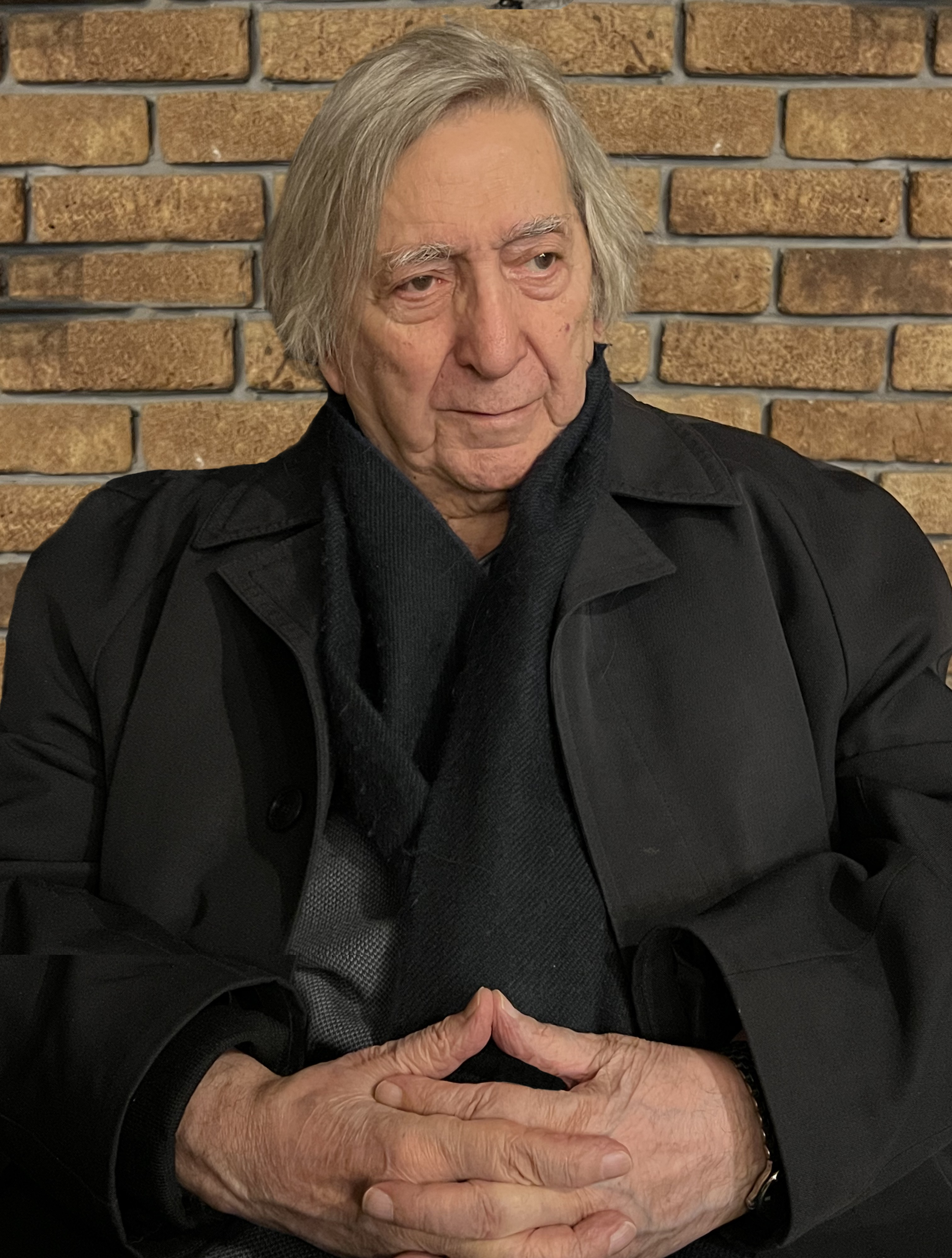
- Alireza Mashayekhi on February 8, 2024

Background information
- Born: 1940 (age 85–86); Tehran, Iran
- Genres: Contemporary classical; Persian symphonic music; electroacoustic
- Occupations: Musician, conductor, composer
- Website: www.alirezamashayekhi.com

Alireza Mashayekhi (Persian: علیرضا مشایخی; born 1940) is an Iranian musician, composer, conductor and academic. He is one of the first composers in Iran to represent avant-garde and electroacoustic music.

== Early life and education ==
Mashayekhi was born in Tehran in 1940. After graduating from the University of Music and Performing Arts in Vienna, he went to Utrecht, the Netherlands, to study electronic and computer music at the Institute of Sonology under Gottfried Michael Koenig.

== Career ==
In 1993, with cooperation of the pianist Farima Ghavam-Sadri, Mashayekhi founded the Tehran Contemporary Music Group. In 1995, he established the Iranian Orchestra for New Music, which released its first recording in 2002 on Hermes Records.

In 2007, Belgian experimental label Sub Rosa released Persian Electronic Music: Yesterday and Today 1966–2006, a double-disc anthology that includes works by Mashayekhi and Ata Ebtekar. In 2009, Brandon Nickell's Isounderscore label released the vinyl double LP Ata Ebtekar & The Iranian Orchestra for New Music Performing Works of Alireza Mashayekhi "Ornamental". Mashayekhi granted Ebtekar full creative freedom to work with the Iranian Orchestra for New Music to arrange and transform his compositions.

== Musical language ==
Mashayekhi's music circulates between a range of styles and genres, from classical compositions inspired by Persian rhythms and Iranian folk music that incorporate meditated repetition and polyphony, to atonal compositions, to works for tape and live electronics that combine traditional Iranian and Western instruments. Mashayekhi calls his compositional practice "Meta-X," referring to the sonic multiplicities present in his work (as contradictions of tonal/atonal, improvised/pre-defined, Persian/non-Persian) that unify within a single musical piece.

== Albums ==
- Mashayekhi, Alireza. 1970. Shur op. 15. in: Electronic Panorama: prospective 21 siecle (LP). Paris, Tokyo, Utrecht, Warszawa: Philips.
- Mashayekhi, Alireza. 1974. (LP). Sonata No. 2 for Violin op. 34, Ad Libitum II for Flute, Clarinet, Bass Clarinet and Violoncello op. 48, Development IV for Piano op. 35, Autonom IV for Flute and Percussion op. 26, Music for Three Tombaks op. 37. Tehran: AhangRooz.
- Mashayekhi, Alireza. 1980. (LP). Symphony No. 3 “An Old-Fashioned Symphony for Computer” op. 76, Mahur III for Computer Generated Sounds and Player(s) op. 72 no. 1, Computer Aesthetic op. 74. in: Computer Music. USA: Retro Records.
- Mashayekhi, Alireza. 1980. (LP). East-West II op. 80, Yaad op. 66, Chahargah I for Violin and Computer Generated Sounds “Saba” op. 75, Iranian Aesthetic op. 77 no. 2. in: Computer Music. USA: Retro Records.
- Mashayekhi, Alireza. 1999. Symphonische Musik persischer Komponisten. Philharmonic Orchestra Plovdiv, Tonkünstlerorchester Vorarlberg Streichorchester der Nordböhmischen Philharmonie, oboe Heidrun Pflüger, conducted by Manuchehr Sahbai. Austria: Aryens EMS.
- Mashayekhi, Alireza. 2001. Interlude for Piano, String Orchestra and Percussion op. 101. Camerata Transsylvanica Budapest, piano Pari Barkeshli, conducted by Manuchehr Sahbai. in: Manuchehr Sahbai conducts compositions by Persian composers. Austria: Aryens EMS.
- Mashayekhi, Alireza. 2001. Delta for Oboe, String Orchestra and Percussion op. 95. Tonkünstler Orchester Vorarlberg, oboe Heidrun Pflüger, conducted by Manuchehr Sahbai. in: Manuchehr Sahbai conducts compositions by Persian composers. Austria: Aryens EMS.
- Mashayekhi, Alireza. 2001. Iranian Orchestra for New Music (Cassette). Iranian Orchestra for New Music, piano Ophelia Kombajian, Tar Behzad Khodarahmi, violin Ali Raees Farshid, violoncello Sanam Gharache, Clarinet Sara Tavassoli, conducted by Alireza Mashayekhi. Tehran: Hermes.
- Mashayekhi, Alireza. 2001. Shahrzad: A Tale in Nine Movements for Piano. piano Farimah Ghavamsadri. Tehran: Organon Institute of Culture and Music.
- Mashayekhi, Alireza. 2001. Interlude for Piano, String Orchestra and Percussion op. 101. Camerata Transsylvanica Budapest, piano Pari Barkeshli, conducted by Manuchehr Sahbai. in: Manuchehr Sahbai conducts works by Persian composers. Tehran: Mahoor Institute of Culture and Art.
- Mashayekhi, Alireza. 2002. Delta for Oboe, String Orchestra and Percussion op. 95. Tonkünstler Orchester Vorarlberg, oboe Heidrun Pflüger, conducted by Manuchehr Sahbai. in: Manuchehr Sahbai conducts works by Persian composers. Tehran: Mahoor Institute of Culture and Art.
- Mashayekhi, Alireza. 2002. Iranian Orchestra for New Music. Iranian Orchestra for New Music, piano Ophelia Kombajian, Tar Behzad Khodarahmi, violin Ali Raees Farshid, violoncello Sanam Gharache, Clarinet Sara Tavassoli, conducted by Alireza Mashayekhi. Tehran: Hermes.
- Mashayekhi, Alireza. 2003. Symphony no. 2: Tehran Symphony. Tehran Symphony Orchestra, NIRT Chamber Orchestra, violin Maziar Zahiroddini, piano Pari Barkeshli, conducted by Farhad Meshkat, Edo Mičič, Ivo Malec. Tehran: Mahoor Institute of Culture and Art.
- Mashayekhi, Alireza. 2004. Shahrzad: A Tale in Nine Movements for Piano. piano Farimah Ghavamsadri. Tehran: Directorate General of Cultural and Extracurricular Affairs, University of Tehran.
- Mashayekhi, Alireza. 2004. Music for piano. piano Farimah Ghavamsadri. Tehran: Hermes.
- Mashayekhi, Alireza. 2005. Happy Electronic Sound. Tehran: music center of Hozeh Honari.
- Mashayekhi, Alireza. 2005. Persian Gardens for piano and orchestra. National Symphony Orchestra of Ukraine, piano Farimah Ghavamsadri, conducted by Volodymyr Sirenko. Tehran: music center of Hozeh Honari.
- Mashayekhi, Alireza. 2005. Celebration. Iranian Orchestra for New Music, piano Farimah Ghavamsadri, violoncello Sanam Gharache, conducted by Alireza Mashayekhi. Tehran: Hermes.
- Mashayekhi, Alireza. 2006. Symphony no. 1. National Symphony Orchestra of Ukraine, conducted by Volodymyr Sirenko. Tehran: music center of Hozeh Honari.
- Mashayekhi, Alireza. 2006. Symphony no. 6 for Oboe and Orchestra op. 125, Development V "Nima" op. 39. Philharmonic Orchestra Plovdiv, oboe Heidrun Pflüger, conducted by Manuchehr Sahbai. in: Orchestral works by Persian composers. Austria: Aryens EMS.
- Mashayekhi, Alireza. 2006. Retrospective III for String Orchestra op. 114, Contradiction II for String Orchestra op. 60. Tonkünstlerorchester Vorarlberg, Severoceske Filharmonie Teplice, conducted by Manuchehr Sahbai. in: Manuchehr Sahbai presents Orchestral works by Persian composers. Austria: Aryens EMS.
- Mashayekhi, Alireza and Ata Ebtekar. 2006. Persian Electronic Music: Yesterday and Today 1966-2006. Belgium: SUB ROSA.
- Mashayekhi, Alireza. 2007. Symphony no. 4: Zagros. National Symphony Orchestra of Ukraine, conducted by Volodymyr Sirenko. Tehran: music center of Hozeh Honari.
- Mashayekhi, Alireza. 2007. Symphony no. 5: A Persian Symphony. National Symphony Orchestra of Ukraine, conducted by Volodymyr Sirenko. Tehran: music center of Hozeh Honari.
- Mashayekhi, Alireza. 2007. Symphony no. 8: Apocalypse. National Symphony Orchestra of Ukraine, piano Farimah Ghavamsadri, conducted by Volodymyr Sirenko. Tehran: music center of Hozeh Honari.
- Mashayekhi, Alireza. 2007. Shur op. 15. in: an anthology of noise and electronic music/ fifth a-chronology 1920-2007. Belgium: SUB ROSA.
- Mashayekhi, Alireza. 2007. Meta-X No. 3 for Violin / Viola, Saxophone, Piano and Percussion op. 161. Ensemble Integral in: Traces of Asia. Eu: Deutschland funk.
- Mashayekhi, Alireza. 2007. The Blind Owl. Tehran Symphony Orchestra, conducted by Farhad Meshkat. Tehran: Hermes.
- Mashayekhi, Alireza. 2009. White Cactus. Iranian Orchestra for New Music, violoncello Sanam Gharache, conducted by Alireza Mashayekhi. Tehran: Ravi-Azar-Kimia music Institute.
- Mashayekhi, Alireza. 2010. Persian Suite. National String Quartet of Ukraine. Tehran: Golcheen.
- Mashayekhi, Alireza. 2009. Direction East. violoncello Sanam Gharache, flute Kent Eanes. Tehran: Ravi-Azar-Kimia music Institute.
- Mashayekhi, Alireza. 2012. Mein Mozart - Mein Mahler. National Symphony Orchestra of Ukraine, clarinet Yuri Nabytovich, conducted by Volodymyr Sirenko. Tehran: Directorate General of Cultural and Extracurricular Affairs, University of Tehran.
- Mashayekhi, Alireza. 2013. Symphony no. 9: My world. National Symphony Orchestra of Ukraine, conducted by Volodymyr Sirenko. Tehran: Mahoor Institute of Culture and Art.
- Mashayekhi, Alireza. 2013. Avec Chopin. piano Farimah Ghavamsadri. Tehran: Mahoor Institute of Culture and Art.
- Mashayekhi, Alireza. 2013. The butterfly of Zagros mountains. piano Farimah Ghavamsadri. Tehran: Mahoor Institute of Culture and Art.
- Mashayekhi, Alireza. 2013. Gardens of Neyshabur. NIRT Chamber Orchestra, Camerata Transylvania Budapest, Ensemble de Percussion du Conservatoire de Nevers, piano Pari Barkeshli, conducted by Ivo Malec, Manuchehr Sahbai, Alireza Mashayekhi. Tehran: Mahoor Institute of Culture and Art.
- Mashayekhi, Alireza. 2013. Uranus. National Symphony Orchestra of Ukraine, Iranian Orchestra for New Music, flute Mehrdad Gholami, conducted by Volodymyr Sirenko, Saeid Abadi, Saeed Alijany. Tehran: Mahoor Institute of Culture and Art.
- Mashayekhi, Alireza. 2013. Terrestrial. National Symphony Orchestra of Ukraine, New Music Percussion Ensemble, violin Paniz Faryousefi, conducted by Volodymyr Sirenko, Mehrdad Teymoori. Tehran: Mahoor Institute of Culture and Art.
- Mashayekhi, Alireza. 2013. Tehran Dual. National Symphony Orchestra of Ukraine, Iranian Orchestra for New Music, violoncello Sanam Gharache, conducted by Volodymyr Sirenko, Alireza Mashayekhi. Tehran: Mahoor Institute of Culture and Art.
- Mashayekhi, Alireza. 2014. Darya: A Persian Suite. National Symphony Orchestra of Ukraine, Tonkünstlerorchester Vorarlberg Streichorchester der Nordböhmischen Philharmonie, New Music Percussion Ensemble, Pars Recorder Orchestra, oboe Heidrun Pflüger, violoncello Sanam Gharache, piano Parisa Golshan, conducted by Volodymyr Sirenko, Manuchehr Sahbai, Mehrdad Teymoori. Tehran: Mahoor Institute of Culture and Art.
- Mashayekhi, Alireza. 2014. Meta X. Iranian Orchestra for New Music, violoncello Sanam Gharache, piano Sina Sedghi, Maryam Mehraban, conducted by Alireza Mashayekhi, Saeed Alijani. Tehran: Mahoor Institute of Culture and Art.
- Mashayekhi, Alireza. 2014. Violin Sonatas. violin Paniz Faryousefi. Tehran: Mahoor Institute of Culture and Art.
- Mashayekhi, Alireza. 2014. Kristall I for Piano op. 113 no. 1, Kristall II for Piano op. 113 no. 2, Retrospective II for Piano op. 109. piano Elnaz Behkam, Niayesh javaheri. in: New Music in Iran volume 1. Tehran: Mahoor Institute of Culture and Art.
- Mashayekhi, Alireza. 2015. Celebration. Iranian Orchestra for New Music, piano Farimah Ghavamsadri, violoncello Sanam Gharache, conducted by Alireza Mashayekhi. Tehran: Mahoor Institute of Culture and Art.
- Mashayekhi, Alireza. 2016. Grand Concerto. National Symphony Orchestra of Ukraine, Shargh Chamber Orchestra, Pars Recorder Orchestra, New Music Percussion Ensemble, violoncello Sanam Gharache, conducted by Volodymyr Sirenko, Mehrdad Teymoori. Tehran: Mahoor Institute of Culture and Art.
- Mashayekhi, Alireza. 2016. The Blind Owl. Tehran Symphony Orchestra, conducted by Farhad Meshkat. Tehran: Mahoor Institute of Culture and Art.
- Mashayekhi, Alireza. 2016. Music for piano. piano Farimah Ghavamsadri. Tehran: Mahoor Institute of Culture and Art.
- Mashayekhi, Alireza. 2016. Iranian Orchestra for New Music. Iranian Orchestra for New Music, piano Ophelia Kombajian, Tar Behzad Khodarahmi, violin Ali Raees Farshid, violoncello Sanam Gharache, Clarinet Sara Tavassoli, conducted by Alireza Mashayekhi. Tehran: Mahoor Institute of Culture and Art.
- Mashayekhi, Alireza. 2016. Spectrum. National Symphony Orchestra of Ukraine, conducted by Volodymyr Sirenko. Tehran: Mahoor Institute of Culture and Art.
- Mashayekhi, Alireza. 2017. 1349. tombak Kambiz Roshanravan, Esmaeil Vaseghi, violin Vahan Ananian, flute Merilyn Swindler, percussion Philip Schutzman, bass clarinet Houshang Bastan Siar, violoncello Mohammad Pourtorab, clarinet Mohammad Ehtemam, piano Pari Barkeshli. Tehran: Mahoor Institute of Culture and Art.
- Mashayekhi, Alireza. 2017. Meditation-Tomorrow for Flute op. 156. flute Kouchyar Shahroudi. in: New Music in Iran volume 2. Tehran: Mahoor Institute of Culture and Art.
- Mashayekhi, Alireza. 2019. Sonata Electronica. National Symphony Orchestra of Ukraine, violin Cyrus Forough, conducted by Volodymyr Sirenko. Tehran: Mahoor Institute of Culture and Art.
- Mashayekhi, Alireza. 2019. Modal 2015. Pars Recorder Orchestra, New Music Percussion Ensemble, Iranian Orchestra for New Music, Tempo dei Bassi Ensemble, violin Amin Ghaffari, piano Maryam Mehraban, contrabasses Regis Prudhomme, violoncello Sanam Gharache, conducted by Mehrdad Teymoori, Saeed Alijany, Regis Prudhomme. Tehran: Mahoor Institute of Culture and Art.
- Mashayekhi, Alireza. 2019. Shur op. 15. in: New Music in Iran volume 3. Tehran: Mahoor Institute of Culture and Art.
- Mashayekhi, Alireza. 2021. Mithra op. 90. in: New Music in Iran volume 4. Tehran: Mahoor Institute of Culture and Art.
- Mashayekhi, Alireza. 2021. Permutation for Flute op. 20, À la recherche du temps perdu for Flute op. 111 no. 3. flute Kelariz Keshavarz. in: Iranian New Waves, vol. I. USA: Petrichor Records.
- Mashayekhi, Alireza. 2022. Abstractum. flute Kelariz Keshavarz, piano Olga Kleiankina. USA: Petrichor Records.
- Mashayekhi, Alireza. 2022. Variant I for Viola op. 139 no. 3, Sonata for Viola and Piano op. 220. viola Kimia Hesabi. piano Ying-Shan Su. in: Nemano Gaona. USA: New Socus Recordings.
- Mashayekhi, Alireza. 2023. Permanent for Fifteen Strings op. 33. NIRT Chamber Orchestra. conducted by Farhad Meshkat. in: New Music in Iran volume 5. Tehran: Mahoor Institute of Culture and Art.
- Mashayekhi, Alireza. 2024. Tehran Berlin. Ensemble unitedberlin, National Quartet of Ukraine, Meta X Ensemble, violoncello Sanam Gharache, violin Ali Raees Farshid, conducted by Catherine Larsen Maguire. Tehran: Mahoor Institute of Culture and Art.
- Mashayekhi, Alireza. 2024. Salome. National Symphony Orchestra of Ukraine, Iranian Orchestra for New Music, Shargh Chamber Orchestra, clarinet Yuri Nabytovich, violin Paniz Faryousefi, saxophone Burkhard Friedrich, violoncello Sanam Gharache, piano Aida Sigharian, conducted by Volodymyr Sirenko, Alireza Mashayekhi, Mehrdad Teymoori. Tehran: Mahoor Institute of Culture and Art.
- Mashayekhi, Alireza. 2024. Black silver. violoncello Marie-Thérèse Grisenti, piano Marc Vitantonio. Tehran: Mahoor Institute of Culture and Art.
- Mashayekhi, Alireza. 2024. Shahrzad: A Tale in Nine Movements for Piano. piano Farimah Ghavamsadri. Tehran: Mahoor Institute of Culture and Art.
- Mashayekhi, Alireza. East-West (Cassette). piano Farimah Ghavamsadri. Tehran: Kargah-e Mousighi.
- Mashayekhi, Alireza. Retrospective (Cassette). piano Farimah Ghavamsadri. Tehran: Kargah-e Mousighi.
- Mashayekhi, Alireza. Saturn. Iranian Orchestra for New Music, saxophone Burkhard Friedrich, flute Azin Movahed, piano Farimah Ghavamsadri, conducted by Alireza Mashayekhi. Tehran: Directorate General of Cultural and Extracurricular Affairs, University of Tehran.

== Published scores ==
- Mashayekhi, Alireza. 1964. Nine Expressions for clarinet and bass clarinet, op. 1. Vienna: Universal Edition.
- Mashayekhi, Alireza. 1973. Sonata No. 2 for violoncello, op. 6, no. 2. Tehran: Faculty of Fine Arts, University of Tehran.
- Mashayekhi, Alireza.1996. Music for piano: Short Stories, Letters, À la recherche du temps perdu. Tehran: Faculty of Fine Arts, University of Tehran.
- Mashayekhi, Alireza. 2002. Music for piano. Tehran: Faculty of Fine Arts, University of Tehran.
- Mashayekhi, Alireza. 2008. Etude Nos. 1-2, pour contrebasse, op. 28, no. 4. in: Collection Musique/Pédagogie dirigeé par Jean-Michel BARDEZ. Paris: Delatour
- Mashayekhi, Alireza. 2009. Moments for piano, op. 119. Tehran: Hamaavaz.
- Mashayekhi, Alireza. 2011. Two Left Hand Etudes for piano, op. 117, nos. 3 and 4. Tehran: Hamaavaz.
- Mashayekhi, Alireza. 2012. Points pour contrebasse et piano, op. 173. Paris: Delatour.
- Mashayekhi, Alireza. 2014. Avec Debussy pour piano, op. 199. Paris: Delatour.
- Mashayekhi, Alireza. 2014. Avec Chopin pour piano, op. 130. Paris: Delatour.
- Mashayekhi, Alireza. 2014. Moments pour piano, op. 119, no. 1. Paris: Delatour.
- Mashayekhi, Alireza. 2014. Une solitude heureuse: A Happy Loneliness pour piano, op. 162, recomposing Franz Schubert's Impromptu No. 4, op. 90. Paris: Delatour.
- Mashayekhi, Alireza. 2015. Points, 3 trios avec contrebasse, op. 173. Paris: Delatour.
- Mashayekhi, Alireza. 2016. Symphony no. 9: My World, conducteur, op. 201. Paris: Delatour.
- Mashayekhi, Alireza. 2017. Persian Gardens for piano, 2 vols. Tehran: Mahoor Institute of Culture and Art.
- Mashayekhi, Alireza. 2017. Shahrzad: A Tale in Nine Movements for piano, op. 115. Tehran: Mahoor Institute of Culture and Art.
- Mashayekhi, Alireza. 2019. Jardins persans pour piano, 2 vols. Paris: Delatour.
- Mashayekhi, Alireza. 2019. Darya: A Persian Suite pour quatuor à cordes, op. 137, no. 2. Paris: Delatour.
- Mashayekhi, Alireza. 2021. Shéhérazade pour piano, op. 115. Paris: Delatour.
- Mashayekhi, Alireza. 2021. Sonata No. 2 for violoncello, op. 6, no. 2. in: A Century of Cello Music from Persian 1921-2021. Amsterdam: Persian Dutch Network
- Mashayekhi, Alireza. 2023. Introduction: An Approach to the performance of 20th and 21st century music. Tehran: Mahoor Institute of Culture and Art.
- Mashayekhi, Alireza. 2024. Sonatas for piano. Vienna: Universal Edition.
- Mashayekhi, Alireza. 2024. Carré Blanc for viola, violoncello and piano, op. 228, no. 1. Vienna: Universal Edition.
- Mashayekhi, Alireza. 2024. Sonata No. 5 for violin and piano, op. 267. Vienna: Universal Edition.
- Mashayekhi, Alireza. 2024. Sonata No. 1 for piano, op. 123. Vienna: Universal Edition.
- Mashayekhi, Alireza. 2024. Sonata No. 2 for piano, op. 159. Vienna: Universal Edition.
- Mashayekhi, Alireza. 2024. Sonata No. 3 for piano, op. 160, version 2022. Vienna: Universal Edition.
- Mashayekhi, Alireza. 2024. Sonata No. 4 for piano, op. 175. Vienna: Universal Edition.
- Mashayekhi, Alireza. 2024. Sonata No. 5 for piano, op. 209. Vienna: Universal Edition.
- Mashayekhi, Alireza. 2024. Sonata No. 6 for piano, op. 237. Vienna: Universal Edition.
- Mashayekhi, Alireza. 2024. Sonata No. 7 for piano, op. 248. Vienna: Universal Edition.
- Mashayekhi, Alireza. 2024. Sonata No. 8 for piano, op. 260. Vienna: Universal Edition.
- Mashayekhi, Alireza. 2024. Sonata No. 9 for piano, op. 269. Vienna: Universal Edition.
- Mashayekhi, Alireza. 2024. Sonata No. 1 for violin and piano, op. 36. Vienna: Universal Edition.
- Mashayekhi, Alireza. 2024. Two Right Hand Etudes for piano, op. 117, nos. 1 and 2. Vienna: Universal Edition.
- Mashayekhi, Alireza. 2024. Darya: A Persian Suite for string orchestra, op. 137, no. 1. Vienna: Universal Edition.
- Mashayekhi, Alireza. 2024. Sonata No. 2 for violin and piano, op. 208. Vienna: Universal Edition.

== Books ==
- Abedinimanesh, Shayandokht. 2010. Notation in Alireza Mashayekhi's Works. Tehran: Cheshmeh.
- Asgari, Majid. 2009. Continuity of Thought: Selected Conversations and Ideas of Alireza Mashayekhi. Tehran: Cheshmeh.
- Golsabahi, Golnaz. 2003. Direction East: Stylistics, works and opinions of Alireza Mashayekhi. Tehran: Talkhoon.
- Khamsepour Ashkan. 2018. About Composition: conversation with Alireza Mashayekhi. Tehran: Sorood.
- Sedghi, Sina. 2016. Stained Window Glasses: An Introduction to the Musical Multiculturalism of Alireza Mashayekhi. Tehran: Mahoor Institute of Culture and Art.
- Sedghi, Sina. 2017. New music in Iran: On the occasion of the 25th anniversary of the establishment of the Tehran Music Group. Tehran: Mahoor Institute of Culture and Art.
- Mashayekhi, Alireza. 1999. Solfege. Tehran: Chang.
- Mashayekhi, Alireza. 2003. Counterpoint: A Survey of Jeppesen's & Fux's Perception of Palestrina’s Style. Tehran: University of Tehran.
- Mashayekhi, Alireza. 2004. Times without memory. Tehran: Arvij.
- Mashayekhi, Alireza. 2006. Tonal Counterpoint. Tehran: Cheshmeh.
- Mashayekhi, Alireza. 2007. Harmony in Classical Music. Tehran: Cheshmeh.
- Mashayekhi, Alireza. 2008. Times without memory. Tehran: Daghayegh.
- Mashayekhi, Alireza. 2008. Parlati e Cantati. Tehran: Shoola.
- Mashayekhi, Alireza. 2010. Tomorrow without me. Tehran: Tehran School.
- Mashayekhi, Alireza. 2011. Culture of Composition, 2 vols. Tehran: music center of Hozeh Honari.
- Mashayekhi, Alireza. 2011. Form in Word’s Music. Tehran: music center of Hozeh Honari.
- Mashayekhi, Alireza. 2014. Tonal Counterpoint. Tehran: Mahoor Institute of Culture and Art.
- Mashayekhi, Alireza. 2014. Harmony in Classical Music. Tehran: Mahoor Institute of Culture and Art.
- Mashayekhi, Alireza. 2018. Counterpoint: Palestrina’s Style. Tehran: Mahoor Institute of Culture and Art.
- Mashayekhi, Alireza. 2019. Times without memory. Tehran: Tehran School.
- Mashayekhi, Alireza. 2019. Parlati e Cantati. Tehran: Hamaavaz.

== See also ==
- Iranian Orchestra for New Music
