= Farhad Fakhreddini =

Farhad Fakhreddini فرهاد فخرالدینی
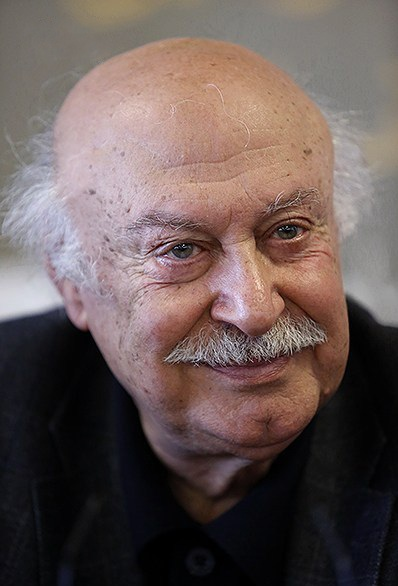
- Farhad Fakhreddini at a press conference, Tehran, 23 February 2014

Background information
- Born: Farhad Fakhreddini; 11 March 1938 (age 88); Gədəbəy, Azerbaijan
- Genres: Persian symphonic music
- Occupations: composer, conductor

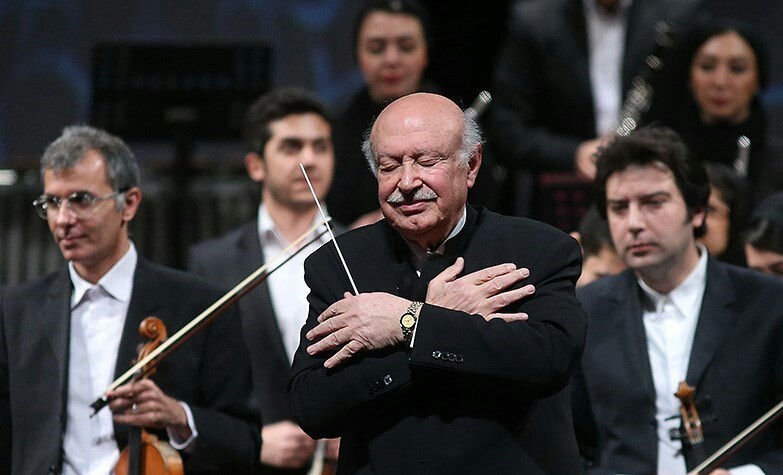
Farhad Fakhreddini in 2016

Farhad Fakhreddini (Persian: فرهاد فخرالدینی; born 11 March 1938 in Gədəbəy, Azerbaijan) is an Iranian composer, conductor and founder of Iran's National Orchestra.

== Career ==
He led Iran's Radio and Television Orchestra from 1973 to 1979.

Fakhreddini has composed music for some of Fereydoon Moshiri's poetry.

Fakhreddini was awarded the 1st Class Order of Culture and Art by the Iranian government in June 2005.

In July 2008, a stamp was issued in his honour.

In July 2009, Fakhreddini quit his position with the Iran's National Orchestra.

One of the best film music writers, such as Sarbedaran & Ememali film & Kif e Englisi

== See also ==
- Music of Iran
- List of Iranian musicians
