= Iran's National Orchestra =

National orchestra of Iran

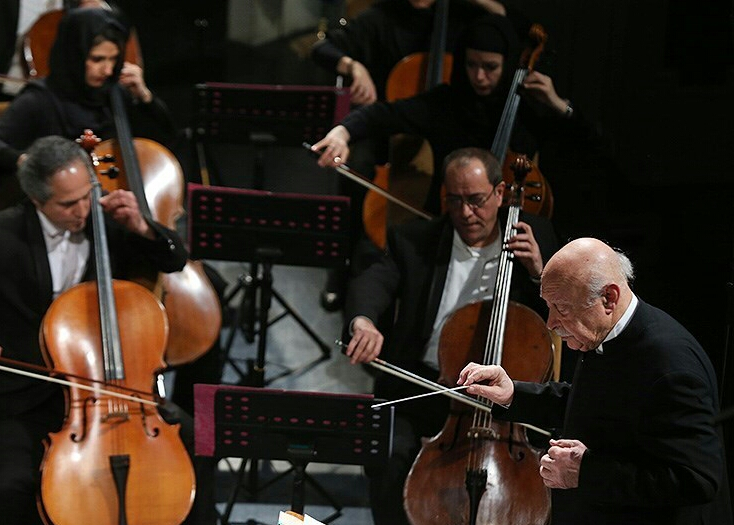
image of Iran's national orchestra

Iran's National Orchestra (Persian: ارکستر ملی ایران) is a national orchestra of Iran, which was founded in 1998 under the conduction of Farhad Fakhreddini.

The Orchestra was dissolved in October 2012, reportedly because of financial problems. However, later it formed again, and performed multiple times in the coming years. On April 27, 2019, it performed some epic and national Iranian songs at Kerman's Ganjali Khan Square. On March 14, 2022, it performed "New Century Song" in Vahdat Hall in Tehran, and on December 4, 2022, it performed in Tehran on the occasion of International Volunteer Day.

The current Principal conductor of Iran's National Orchestra is Homayoun Rahimian.

== Singers ==
- Mohammadreza Shajarian
- Alireza Eftekhari
- Mohammad Motamedi
- Alireza Ghorbani
- Mohammad Esfahani
- Hosein alishapour

== See also ==
- Tehran Symphony Orchestra
- Iranian Orchestra for New Music
- Melal Orchestra (Nations Symphony Orchestra)
