= David Garner (composer) =

American classical composer

David Ross Garner (born August 4, 1954) is an American composer of opera and vocal, instrumental, and chamber music. He is also an educator, on faculty at the San Francisco Conservatory of Music.

== Early life, education, and personal life ==
David Garner was born in South Side, Chicago. He spent most of his childhood in Lincoln, Nebraska and Lake Oswego, Oregon upon his parents’ relocations for academic positions. He was given piano and cello lessons throughout his childhood and performed in recitals and with youth orchestras.

Garner attended UCLA as a Classics major for two years before deciding that music was a better match. He left in 1974 and returned home to Oregon where he pursued music privately, playing blues, rock fusion, and classical piano while he prepared to audition at the San Francisco Conservatory of Music for the piano performance program. He was originally rejected from the program and spent six months as an adult extension student before auditioning again and being accepted in 1976. He would complete his degree in piano performance in 1979. He is married to the classical pianist Dale Tsang, who has premiered many of his solo piano and chamber works, along with distinguished soloists.

== Career ==
=== Teaching career ===
Concurrent with his graduating from the San Francisco Conservatory, Garner was appointed to the faculty as a part-time theory instructor, becoming full-time in 1984 when he was also named Chairman of the Musicianship and Theory Department. He remained in that position until 2000, when he elected to take a position in the Composition Department. He has remained in that position since and currently teaches composition to a select students.

=== Composition career ===
Garner began composing in his youth, and has never had a lesson in composition. His body of work covers a wide variety of instrumentation, with his most prolific content being produced for the voice. He has produced a continuous output of compositional work since the early 1980s, shortly after becoming a faculty member at the San Francisco Conservatory. Garner's compositions have won multiple awards and grants, including First Place for the American Prize in Composition in 2015 and two Silver Medals from the Global Music Awards for Spoon River Songs and Surviving: Women’s Words.

Garner developed a compositional technique for his String Quartet No. 2 which he calls Tonal Serialism. He describes it as “a method of musical composition that uses precepts of the 12-tone techniques developed by Arnold Schoenberg and the Second Viennese School with one important difference: where ‘classical serialism’ seeks to obscure tonal centricity and favor ‘free’ tonality, tonal serialism preserves harmonic and structural elements of traditional tonal music, most notably a purposeful gravitation toward a tonal center through the coincidence of vertical consonance and dissonance.”

Garner’s work is frequently commissioned by performers and organizations, and his compositions have been recorded on the Centaur and Pentatone labels, in addition to self-produced recordings and a release produced by Quadre Music Group. He is also the resident composer for Ensemble for These Times, a chamber music group whose work focuses on contemporary repertoire.

==== Operas ====
Mary Pleasant at Land’s End is Garner’s first full-length opera, composed of two acts and set to a libretto by Mark Hernandez, also an alumnus of the San Francisco Conservatory of Music. The work was commissioned by Opera Parallèle. The opera gives an account of Mary Ellen Pleasant, a daughter of slaves who assisted with the Underground Railroad before moving West to San Francisco’s Barbary Coast. The opera explores Pleasant’s significance as an integral part of the founding of San Francisco and the state of California, as she fought to ensure the civil rights of black settlers.

According to librettist Mark Hernandez, the opera “traces much of Pleasant’s astonishing life, beginning with her days as a shepherd for the Underground Railroad. Arriving in San Francisco, she becomes a beloved leader in the young city. Eventually, this daughter of slaves stands as one of the richest and most influential individuals of the time. Her championing of people and causes, however, brings her into conflict with a more familiar face of wealth and power, and the ensuing struggle plays out in a notorious courtroom drama that mesmerizes the public. Sensationalist press coverage demonizes Pleasant, playing on attitudes towards her race and gender. An essential figure in the founding of San Francisco, and indeed the state of California, she is forgotten even as the city bursts into world prominence.”

Set in the 1880s, Mary Pleasant at Land’s End is composed of two acts (approximately two hours of music total), and calls for four principal artists, six comprimario artists, and mixed chorus. The music is replete with the soaring vocalism for which Garner is so widely admired. He uses an eclectic mix of musical styles, including quotes from popular music of the 1870s and 1880s, along with a large amount of percussion and ostinato. Much of the percussion employs traditional drumming patterns of the Caribbean, which Garner uses to represent the four major characters. Hernandez's libretto draws on language and circumstances of the time, drawing on the historical perspective gathered in Lynn M. Hudson's book, “The Making of ‘Mammy Pleasant’.” Hernandez “felt it was important that it be as [historically] accurate as possible.”

A full workshop of the opera was presented on January 14, 2017, at the San Francisco Conservatory of Music. The opera is slated to be the first major opera to come out of a conservatory for more than 100 years.

Garner's previous operas include Daughter of Night (2010), and The Money Tree (1999), both one-act operas.

==== Songs and vocal music ====
Music involving the voice makes up the majority of Garner's works. In this genre, Garner has been consistently lauded for his careful attention to setting text, his skill described as “getting to the semantic core of each of the poems he has set.” His eclectic background in musical styles informs his accompaniments, displaying rhythmic and melodic elements which support the texts of his pieces. He has written for a cappella voice, voice and piano, voice and chamber ensemble, and for choral ensembles.

Co-founder of the chamber group Ensemble for These Times, Garner composed four song cycles as part of their Jewish Music & Poetry Project: Chanson für Morgen (2011–12), Phönix (2013), Song is a Monument (2014), and Mein blaues Klavier (2015). The cycles were recorded by the ensemble under the project name Surviving: Women’s Words, released on Centaur Records in April 2016.

From 2007 to 2013, he worked with Iranian American soprano Raeeka Shehabi-Yaghmai to compose piano accompaniments and orchestrations of Persian melodies for the Persian Melody Project. Yaghmai purposely sought out Garner as someone who would merge the sound and techniques of Western composition to the melodies originating in the Middle East. The Project has currently produced eighteen songs, with five pieces receiving their orchestrated world premiere with Oakland East Bay Symphony in 2008. Ten of the songs accompanied by piano have been recorded and slated for CD release in 2017.

Garner's work Phenomenal Woman was commissioned by Kathleen Sisco in 2004 and appears on Garner's CD Phenomenon: The Music of David Garner, on the Pentatone Classics label. The work was performed by Lisa Delan in May 2010 for Jazz at Lincoln Center.

==== Instrumental music ====
Garner's instrumental music includes works for solo and duo piano, chamber music, and orchestral music.

His String Quartet No. 2 was commissioned by the 2014 San Francisco-Shanghai International Chamber Music Festival. The piece won the 2015 American Prize in Composition in the Chamber Music Professional Division. His first quartet (String Quartet No. 1) was commissioned by the Picasso Quartet and was premiered in 2009.

== Distinguished students ==
- Darius Derakhshani - earning PhD and on faculty at UC Santa Barbara
- Dr. Shahab Paranj - head of Persian Studies at UCLA
- Luke Mayernik - music director and organist at St. Susannah Catholic Church, Mason, OH, with numerous compositions published through Graphite and GIA Press
- Nicholas Denton-Protsack, earning PhD from Victoria University, Wellington NZ

== Selected compositions ==
- Three Blake Settings, for soprano and piano (1985)
- Annettes-Lieder, for soprano, cello and piano (1986)
- Dances From King David, for soprano and piano (1988)
- Four for Shiva for piano, four hands (1988)
- Trio, for three marimbas (1989)
- Rorrim’s Run, for violin and piano (1989)
- Medea Alone, for a cappella soprano (1989)
- Six Caprices of García Lorca, for tenor and piano (1990)
- Three Etudes, for piano (1994)
- El Alma y la Memoria, for soprano and piano (1995)
- Epitaphs, for mixed a cappella chorus (1996)
- Fireflies and Willows, three songs for soprano, baritone and piano (1997)
- Tombstones in the Starlight, for soprano and piano (1998)
- Cinco Poemas de Jaime Manrique, for tenor and piano (1999)
- The Money Tree, one-act opera (1999)
- Seven Nocturnes, for mezzo-soprano and chamber orchestra (2000)
- Dhurga Dances, for two pianos (2001)
- Viñetas Flamencas, for tenor, piano and woodwind quintet (2001)
- Five Fugues for Organ (1997–2002)
- Five Chokas for the New Princess, for 3 women's voices, a cappella (2003)
- Trumpet Sonata, for trumpet and piano (2004)
- Cuadro Cuadrangulos, for four horns (2004)
- String Quartet No. 1 (2004)
- Phenomenal Woman, for soprano and piano (2004)
- The Cremation of Sam McGee, for soprano, violin and piano (2005)
- Piano Trio (2007)
- Six Persian Songs and Melodies, for soprano and orchestra (2008)
- Danny Boy, for tenor and piano (arrangement) (2008)
- Compound Carmen, a burlesque for two mezzo-sopranos and speaker (2008)
- Daughter of Night, one-act opera for solo mezzo-soprano and jazz ensemble (2010)
- Spoon River Songs, for mezzo-soprano and piano (2010)
- Chanson für Morgen, for soprano and piano (2011)
- Vilna Poems, for soprano, clarinet, cello and piano (2012)
- Phönix, for soprano and piano (2013)
- String Quartet No. 2 (2013)
- Six (more) Persian Songs and Melodies, for soprano and orchestra (2013)
- Cello Capriccio, for cello and piano (2014)
- Three Carols, for soprano, baritone, oboe, percussion and strings (2014)
- Song is a Monument, for soprano, cello and piano (2014)
- Mein blaues Klavier, for soprano, cello and piano (2015)
- Auld Lang Syne, for soprano, cello and piano (arrangement) (2015)
- Mary Pleasant at Land’s End, full 2-act opera (2016)
- Jump. I will catch you, for mezzo-soprano, cornet, double bass and harp (2016)
- Trio for 5 Instruments, for oboe, English horn, clarinet in A, bass clarinet, and double bass (2017)

== Discography ==
2005 – Citrus. Includes Cuadro Cuadrangulos. Works by Francisco de Paula Aguier, David Garner, Nathan Pawelek, Mark Adam Watkins, Christopher Wiggins, Daniel Wood. Performed by Meredith Brown, Alex Camphouse, Nathan Pawelek, Daniel Wood. Quadre Music Group 733792657229.

2008 – And If the Song Be Worth a Smile. Includes Annettes-Lieder. Works by William Bolcom, David Garner, Gordon Getty, Jake Heggie, Luna Pearl Woolf. Performed by Kristin Pankonin, Matt Haimovitz, Susanne Mentzer, Lisa Delan. PENTATONE PTC 5186099.

2009 – Phenomenon:The Music of David Garner. Includes excerpts from Spoon River Songs, Viñetas Flamencas, Fireflies and Willows, Phenomenal Woman. Performed by Kristin Pankonin, Lisa Delan, Stephanie Friede, William Stone, Francsico Araiza, Susanne Mentzer. PENTATONE PTC 5186301.

2013 – The Hours Begin to Sing. Includes Vilna Poems. Performed by Lisa Delan, Kristin Pankonin, Matt Haimovitz, David Krakauer,. PENTATONE PTC 5186459.

2013 – Spoon River Songs. Performed by Catherine Cook and Kristin Pankonin. David Garner 888174568966.

2015 – December Celebration: New Carols by Seven American Composers. Includes Three Carols. Works by Mark Adamo, William Bolcom, John Corigliano, David Garner, Gordon Getty, Jake Heggie, Luna Pearl Woolf. Performed by Lisa Delan, Lester Lynch, Steven Bailey, Dawn Harms, Musicians of the New Century Chamber Orchestra, Volti Chorus. PENTATONE PTC 5186537.

2016 – Out of the Shadows: Rediscovered American Art Songs. Includes Auld Lang Syne. Works by Paul Bowles, David Garner, Gordon Getty, Paul Nordoff, Stephen Paulus. Performed by Lisa Delan, Kevin Korth, Matt Haimovitz. PENTATONE PTC 5186572.

2016 – Surviving: Women’s Words. Includes Chanson für Morgen, Mein blaues Klavier, Phönix, Song Is a Monument. Performed by Nanette McGuiness, Dale Tsang, Adaiha Somer, Ensemble for These Times. Centaur Records CEN 3490.

== Awards and grants ==
1997 – Sarlo Family Foundation Award for Excellence in Teaching

2012 – Faculty Development Grant, for recording Spoon River Songs

2012 – Faculty Development Grant, for recording Spoon River Songs

2013 – Nomination, American Academy of Arts and Letters Award in Music

2013 – Nomination, American Academy of Arts and Letters Award in Music

2014 – Hal Leonard Labor of Love Composition Contest, for Cinq Hommages

2014 – Hal Leonard Labor of Love Composition Contest, for Cinq Hommages

2014 – Opera Parallèle, Grant Award for creation of Mary Pleasant at Land’s End

2014 – Opera Parallèle, Grant Award for creation of Mary Pleasant at Land’s End

2015 – Faculty Development Grant, for recording Surviving: Women’s Words

2015 – Faculty Development Grant, for recording Surviving: Women’s Words

2015 – First Prize, American Prize in Composition, String Quartet No. 2

2015 – First Prize, American Prize in Composition, String Quartet No. 2

2016 – Silver Medal, Global Music Awards, Spoon River Songs

2016 – Silver Medal, Global Music Awards, Spoon River Songs

2016 – Silver Medal, Global Music Awards, Surviving: Women’s Words

2016 – Silver Medal, Global Music Awards, Surviving: Women’s Words
