= Majid Mowlania =

Iranian composer

- Born: 1980 (age 45–46)
- Occupation: Composer

Majid Molania (born 1980) is an Iranian traditional music composer. He is a winner of the Barbad Award for Best Iranian Music Composer of the Year for the album Shall Live in Love.

== Works ==
- Dowran-e Eshgh
- Cheshm Bikhab
- Shall Live in Love
