= Sahar Mohammadi =

Iranian singer

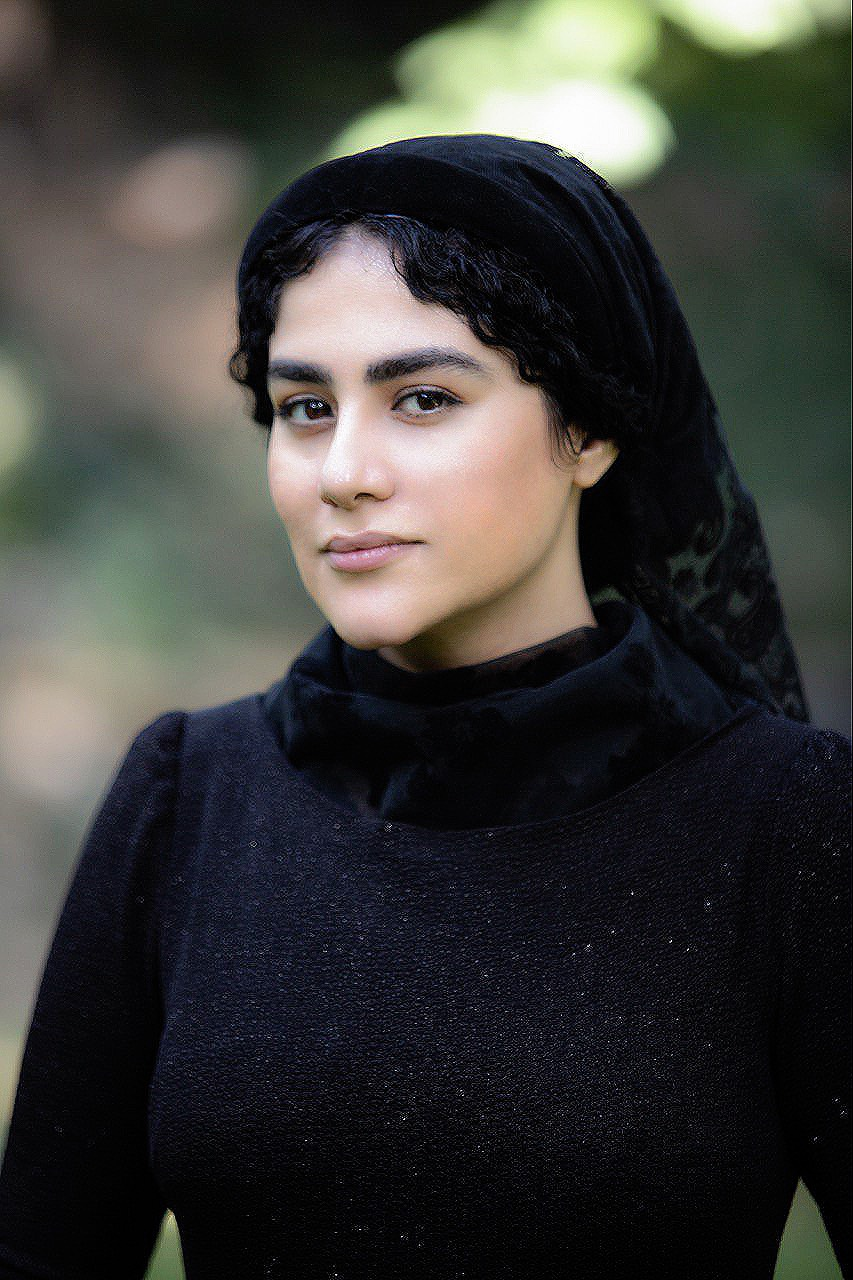

Background information
- Born: 1988 borujerd, Iran
- Genres: Persian/Iranian Classical Music
- Occupation: Singer
- Instrument(s): Tar, Setar
- Website: Sahar Mohammadi Website

Sahar Mohammadi, born in borujerd, is an Iranian singer of classical radifs and the lyrics of Hafez. She studied the tar and setar at university in Tehran before specialising in song. She has been described as "one of the young generation's most talented performers of classical Persian song".

In 2016 she performed in the opening ceremony of the 22nd World Sacred Music Festival in Fez, Morocco.

On 18 June 2019, her concert in Nantes was interrupted by a RAID intervention following a hoax bomb threat, much as her concert in Langon had been two years previously.
