= Homayoun Shajarian =

Iranian singer and musician

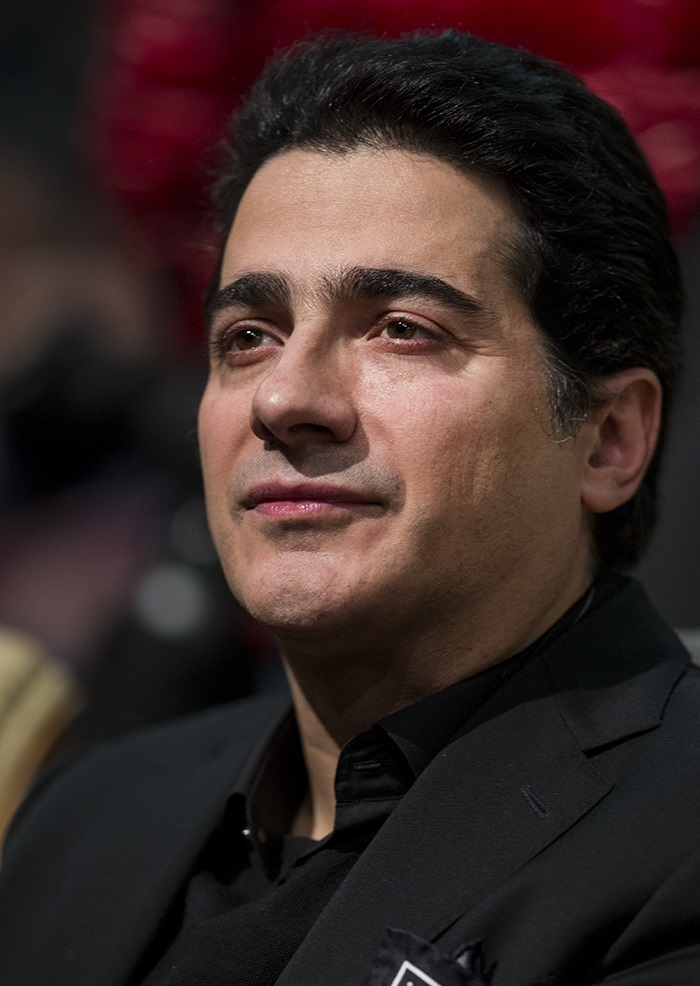
- Shajarian in 2019
- Born: 21 May 1975 (age 51); Tehran, Iran
- Occupation: Musician
- Spouse: Gita Khansari (m. 1996; div. 2015)
- Children: Yasmine Shajarian
- Parent: Mohammad Reza Shajarian (father)
- Musical career
- Genres: Iranian traditional music, folk, tasnife

Homayoun Shajarian (Persian: همايون شجريان, born 21 May 1975) is an Iranian singer. Homayoun is the son of Iranian singer Mohammad-Reza Shajarian, He learned singing from his father and started his musical career in the 1990s.

== Early life ==
Shajarian was born in Tehran and is the son of Mohammad-Reza Shajarian, a grand master vocalist of Persian traditional music. At a young age, he began studying the tombak, a Persian hand drum, and Persian traditional vocal Avaz as well as Kamancheh.

== Career ==
Shajarian attended Tehran Conservatory of Music, choosing Kamancheh as his professional instrument, and was tutored by Ardeshir Kamkar. In 1991, he accompanied his father in concerts of Ava Music Ensemble in the United States, Europe and Iran, playing Tombak and from 1999 on, he started accompanying his father also on vocals. In 1995 he married Guitta Khansari, their child, Yasmine Shajarian, was born in 2007 in Tehran, Iran. They were divorced in 2015. His first independent work Nassim-e Vasl, composed by Mohammad Javad Zarrabian, was released on his 28th birthday, on 21 May 2003. He performed live-stream concert on 24 May 2020 during coronavirus pandemic.

In July 2024, Shajarian released a piece of music and a music video in collaboration with Sami Yusuf.

In June 2025, Shajarian performed at Saad Abdullah Hall in Erbil with composer and pianist Anoushiravan Rohani. The concert ended with "Morgh-e Sahar", a song closely associated with his father's concert repertory.

== Personal life ==
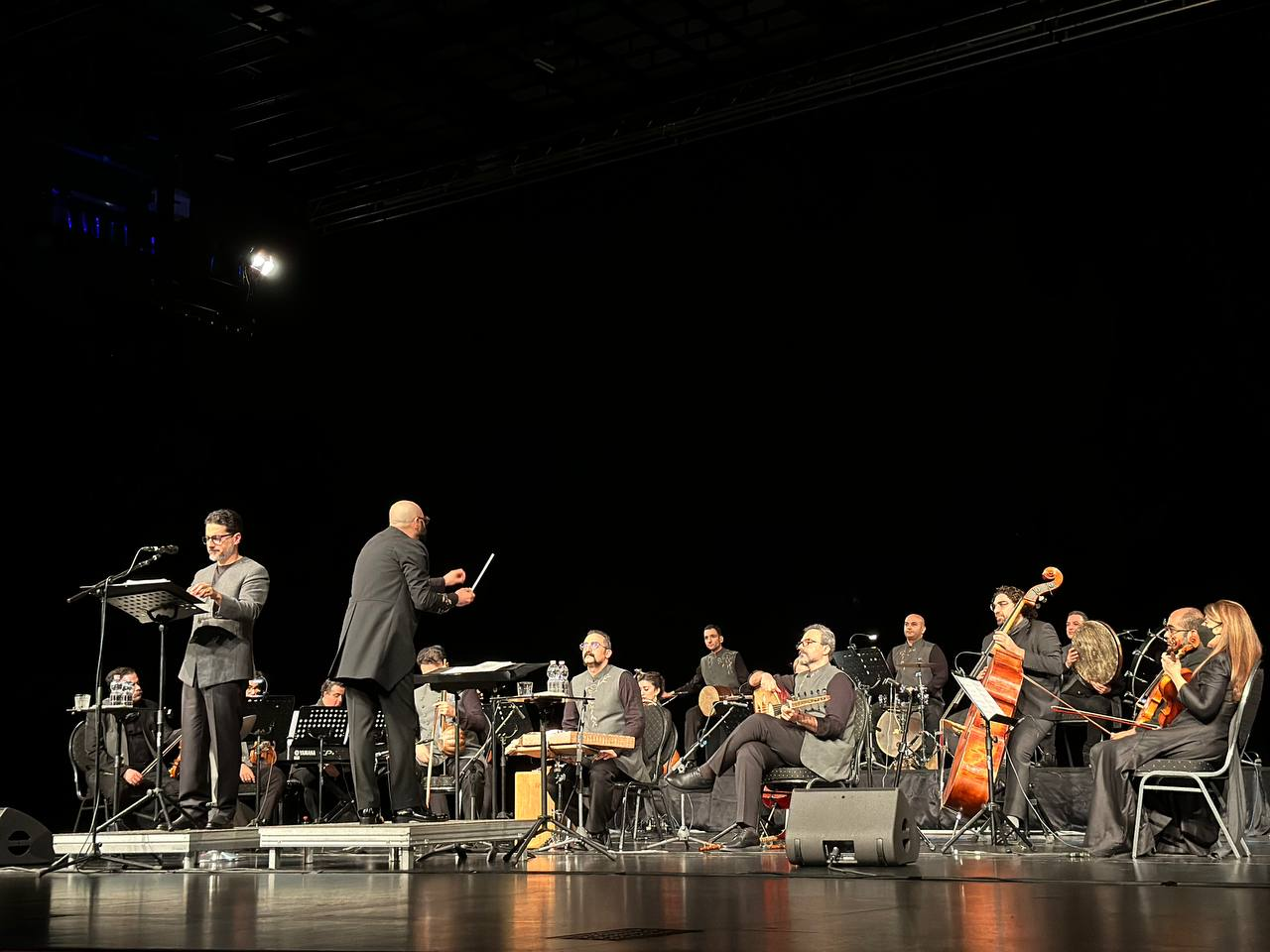
Homayoun Shajarian in Vienna, October 2023

His wife was Guitta Khansari, with whom he has a daughter. Their daughter, Yasmine, was born on 6 November 2007 in Tehran, Iran. They divorced after a few years.

On 5 January 2026, Shajarian announced he was cancelling his European concerts in support of the 2025–2026 Iranian protests.

== Discography ==
=== Studio albums ===
- Wind of Reaching (2003)
- Impatient (2004)
- Passion of Friend (2004)
- Role of Dream (2005)
- With Stars (2006)
- Koli Ghaychak (2007)
- Sun of Wish (2008)
- Water, Bread, Song (2009)
- Night of Separation (2010)
- My Love Don't Leave Without Me (2012)
- Heavenly (2012)
- What Fires (2013)
- Gods of Secrets (2015)
- In Oblivion (2022)
- Bi Sharaf (2025)

=== Collaborative albums ===
- Tune of Faith (1998) (with Mohammad Reza Shajarian)
- Can't Go On Living Without You (2002) (with Mohammad Reza Shajarian)
- Turmoil of Lovers (2007) (with Mohammad Reza Shajarian)
- Love Letter (2011) (with Abdolghader Maraghi Ensemble)
- Simorgh (2013) (with Simorgh Orchestra, Hamid Motebassem)
- Beyond Any Form (2014) (with Tahmoures Pournazeri)
- The Lord of the Secrets (2015) (with Sohrab Pournazari, Siavash Ensemble)
- Sleep Next to My Love Poems Tonight (2017) (with Fardin Khal Atbari)
- The Occult and the Intoxicated (2017) (with Jano Baghoumian)
- My Iran (2018) (with Sohrab Pournazeri)
- The Myth of Your Eyes (2019) (with Alireza Ghorbani, Mahyar Alizadeh)

=== Soundtrack albums ===
- Heavy Makeup (2014) (with Sohrab Pournazeri)
- Subdued (2017) (with Sohrab Pournazeri)

=== Extended plays ===
- Mind (2020) (with Seventh Soul, Mohammad Reza Shajarian)

=== Singles ===
List of singles, with year released and album name shown
Title	Year	Original title	Album	Notes
"In Love"	2017	عاشقی	Non-album singles	
"Persian Gulf"	2017	خلیج فارس	Non-album singles	
"Hey Conscious"	2017	آهای خبردار	Subdued	
"Amnesia Again (with Kaveh Abedin)"	2017	بار دگر فراموشی	Non-album singles	
"It's Raining (with Sohrab Pournazeri)"	2017	ابر میبارد	Subdued	
"I Got Mad (with Seventh Soul)"	2020	دیوانه گشتم	Non-album singles	
"Adventure (with Seventh Soul)"	2020	ماجرا	Non-album singles	
"Savushun (with Tahmoures Pournazeri)"	2021	سووشون	Non-album singles	
"All Eyes"	2021	محو تماشا	Non-album singles	
"Cloudy Sky"	2021	آسمان ابری	Non-album singles	From "I Want to Live" Original Soundtrack
"Land of My Romances"	2021	دیار عاشقی هایم	Non-album singles	
"Weather of Your Whispers"	2021	هوای زمزمه هایت	Non-album singles	From "I Want to Live" Original Soundtrack
"Flaming (with Nosrat Fatehali Khan)"	2021	شعله ور	Non-album singles	From The Motion Picture "Flaming"
"One Breath of Your Desire"	2021	یک نفس آرزوی تو	Non-album singles	From "I Want to Live" Original Soundtrack
"Visionary Wing of Love"	2021	بال رویایی عشق	Non-album singles	
"Sirius (with Mojgan Shajarian)"	2021	شباهنگ	Non-album singles	
"Destiny"	2021	سرنوشت	Non-album singles	
"Seven Labours (with Seventh Soul)"	2022	هفت خوان	Non-album singles	
"On This Black Nigh"	2022	در این شب سیاه	Non-album singles	From "Jeyran" Original Soundtrack
"Cry"	2022	گریه کن	Non-album singles	From "Jeyran" Original Soundtrack
"Don't Leave Your Hair in the Wind"	2022	زلف بر باد مده	Non-album singles	
"Mansion of Heart (with Seventh Soul)"	2022	عمارت دل	Non-album singles	
"My Heart Is Crying"	2022	دل من میگرید	Non-album singles	
"Dorre Dordaneh with Pouya Saraei"	2024	در دردانه	Non-album singles	
"Sarmastam with Pouya Saraei"	2024	سرمستم	Non-album singles	

== See also ==
- Music of Iran
- List of Iranian musicians
