= Fez Festival of World Sacred Music =

Annual music festival held in Fez, Morocco

Coordinates: 34.0609°N 4.9803°W

Fes World Sacred Music Festival
- Location: Fez, Morocco
- Years active: 1994–present
- Website: fesfestival.com

The Fez Festival of World Sacred Music (Festival des Musiques Sacrées du Monde) is an annual music festival that is held for a week in Fez, Morocco. It was first held in 1994 and usually held over 10 days in early June. The festival includes concerts, debates, and joint performances of Muslim and Christian devotional music from artists from all over the world.

According to Fawzi Sakkali, the former president of the festival, the goal of the event is to highlight Islam's multifaceted nature as a civilization encompassing philosophy, art, urbanism, architecture, and humanism. Furthermore, the festival seeks to foster dialogue between Western and North African scholars, artists, and writers on diverse topics related to the intersection of spirituality, society, and artistic expression and to promote better understanding between cultures and faiths through exposure to sacred music.

== History ==
The Fez Festival of World Sacred Music was established in 1994 by Faouzi Skali, a philanthropist and the president of the Spirit of Fez Foundation, with the goal of promoting unity among individuals of all races and religions through spiritual and humanitarian values, inspired by Andalusian principles. Skali believed that music, being a universal language, has the power to communicate with people from all walks of life.

The festival was canceled in 2020 and 2021 due to the COVID-19 pandemic.

In 2022, allegations arose against the festival organizers for allegedly barring the participation Tibetan musician Loten Namling following purported influence from the Chinese government. Namling, an activist and political refugee who resides in Switzerland, initially received an invitation to perform at the festival's opening event but subsequently received notice that his invitation had been revoked. It is suspected that the Chinese Embassy in Morocco may have intervened with the Moroccan Ministry of Foreign Affairs to prevent Namling from obtaining a visa.

Over the years, the festival has showcased artists such as Patti Smith, Kadim Al-Sahir, Youssou N'Dour, Sami Yusuf, Salif Keita, Ravi Shankar, Miriam Makeba, Björk, Joan Baez and Masters of Persian Music.

== See also ==
- Dar Adiyel
