= Alireza Ghorbani =

Alireza Ghorbani علیرضا قربانی
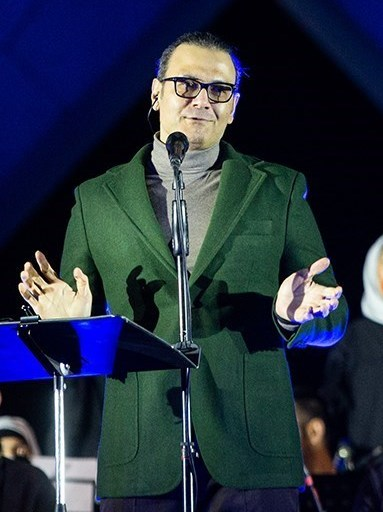
- Ghorbani in 2021

Background information
- Born: 31 January 1972 (age 54); Tehran, Iran
- Genres: Persian traditional music, Classic, World
- Occupation: Singer
- Years active: 1994–present
- Website: www.alirezaghorbani.com

Alireza Ghorbani (Persian: علیرضا قربانی; born 4 February 1972) is an Iranian traditional vocalist.

== Biography ==
He began his career by reciting the Quran. Soon he started eagerly learning traditional Iranian music. In 1984, he was fascinated by compilations of poetry and music and the insight into Iranian music under the supervision of his first mentors: Khosro Soltani, Behrooz Abedini, Mahdi Fallah, Hossein Omoumi, Ahmad Ebrahimi and also Razavi Sarvestani. His acquaintance with Ali Tajvidi and Farhad Fakhreddini led him to new horizons in Iranian music.

He has taken part in many important festivals all over the world together with many musicians. Some of these festivals and programs are available on CD. He has been the vocalist of Iran's National Orchestra since 1999 and has joined many concerts and festivals within Iran and abroad. Enthusiasm, the first album of the National Iranian Orchestra, has also been composed by Farhad Fakhreddini. Although he collaborated in making soundtracks for many different TV programs such as Kife Englisi, Shabe Dahom, Roshantar az Khamooshi (Mollasadra) and Madare Sefr Darajeh. His latest albums are Az Kheshto Khak, Fasle Baran, Rosvaye Zamaneh, Sarve Ravan, Symphony of Molana, Soogvarane Khamoosh, Rooy Dar Aftab 1,2, Eshtiagh, Ghafe Eshgh, Khoshnevise Seda and Sarmasti (Khayyam).

The concert of “ Hame Iranam” or A Persian Night with Vancouver Opera Orchestra conducted by Shardad Rohani, was performed at the Queen Elizabeth Theatre in Vancouver, Canada on January 6, 2018. The world premier of Symphonic Poem "Hame Iranam" composed by Kambiz Roshan Ravan was performed in this concert and Alireza Ghorbani was the vocalist of this Symphonic Poem.

The concert of “Resurrection” or “A Persian Night" with Vancouver Opera Orchestra featuring Vancouver Bach Choir conducted by Leslie Dala, was performed at the Orpheum theatre in Vancouver, Canada on January 20, 2019. Alireza Ghorbani was the vocalist in his second performance with Vancouver Opera Orchestra.

He collaborated with Homayoun Shajarian on his latest album Afsaneye-Chashmhayat released on 10 Nov 2019.

In 2022, he was refused entry into the United States on his way to a sold-out Nowruz concert at the Segerstrom Center for the Arts in Costa Mesa, likely due to having served in the Islamic Revolutionary Guard Corps as a conscript.

“The Voices and Bridges” is an ongoing multi-lingual, multicultural collaboration between musicians from many parts of the world including Alireza Ghorbani (lead singer) in collaboration with Ehsan Matoori as a composer and Bombay Jayashri, Celia Woodsmith, Qaiser Nizami, and others. This music project is an exploration which brings together languages of ancient cultures such as Persian, Spanish, Arabic, English, Turkish, Indian and French to create a new story inspired. The style and genre used in the project is Global Music inspired by different musical traditions. All musical tracks are recorded acoustically. The lyrics are inspired by many prominent poets around the world such as Borges, Youshij, Pablo Neruda, Allama Iqbal, Lal Ded, Rabindranath Tagore, and Rumi.

== Concert in Persepolis ==
Alireza Ghorbani is the first Iranian singer who was able to hold a concert in the outer space of Persepolis.

== Discography ==
year	Persian Title	English title	Composer	Further Notes
2000	اشتیاق Eshtiagh	Enthusiasm	Farhad Fakhredini	with Iran National Orchestra
2004	فصل باران Fasle Baran	Rain Season	Majid Derakhshani	
2005	از خشت و خاک Az Khesht o Khak	From clay and soil	Sadegh Cheraghi	
2006	سوگواران خموش Sougvaran-e Khamoush	Silent mourners	Pejman Taheri	
2006	روی در آفتاب Rooy Dar Aftab	In the sun	Sadegh Cheraghi	
2008	سرو روان Sarv-e Ravan	Moving cypress	Ali Ghamsari	
2008	سمفونی مولانا	Symphony of Mowlana	Houshang Kamkar	
2009	رسوای زمانه Rosvay-e Zamaneh	The scandal of the age	Homayoun Khorram	
2009	قاف عشق Ghaf-e Eshgh	The Qāf of Love	Alireza Ghorbani	
2011	بر سماع تنبور Bar Sama-e Tanboor	To the music of tanbur	Shams Ensemble	
2011	جلوه گل Jelve-ye Gol	The flower’s appearance	Dariush Talaei	
2012	حریق خزان Harigh-e Khazan	The fire of autumn	Mahyar Alizadeh	
2012	هم آواز پرستوهای آه Hamavaz-e Parastoohay-e Aah		Siavash Valipoor	
2014	رفتم و بار سفر بستم Raftam-o Bar-e Safar Bastam		Ali Tajvidi	arranged by Kambiz Roshanravan
2014	قطره‌های باران Ghatrehaye Baran		Shams Ensemble	
2015	سودایی	Éperdument	Saman Samimi	Released in France
2015	دخت پری‌وار Dokht-e Parivar	Fairy Like Girl	Mahyar Alizadeh	
2016	من عاشق چشمت شدم Man Ashegh-e Chashmat Shodam		Fardin Khalatbari	
2018	فروغ Forough		Saman Samimi	
2019	افسانه چشمانت Afsaneh-ye Chashmanat		Mahyar Alizadeh	Feat with Homayoun Shajarian
2020	با من بخوان Ba Man Bekhan	Sing With Me	Hesam Naseri	

== See also ==
- Music of Iran
- Persian symphonic music
