= Nima Kiann =

Iranian choreographer

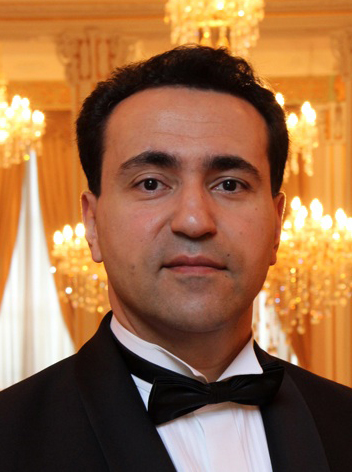
- Born: January 26, 1970 (age 56); Tehran, Iran
- Known for: Choreography; Dance impresario; Dance scholar

Nima Kiann (Persian: نیما کیان; born January 26, 1970) is an Iranian-born Swedish ballet dancer, choreographer, visual artist, and dance scholar.

He recreated the disbanded Iranian National Ballet Company in Sweden, founded as Les Ballets Persans, and as their artistic director worked with national ballet companies in Central Asia, resulting in the revival of forgotten ballets, and organized the first international tour for the National Ballet of Kyrgyzstan and the National Ballet of Tajikistan since the dissolution of the Soviet Union.

== Early life and education ==
Nima Kiann was born in Tehran, Iran, and attended Tehran Fine Arts School (Persian: هنرستان هنرهای زیبای پسران تهران). At the age of seventeen, he moved to Turkey and later to Sweden. He entered the Gothenburg Ballet Academy in 2001 as the only male dance student. Lia Schubert, the founder-director of the academy, created a special classical training program for Kiann. He subsequently took principal roles at Theatre Talia.

Kiann received his first professional dance contract in 1994 at the Gotheburg Opera Ballet, a year before completing his dance education at the Gothenburg Ballet Academy. After his graduation, he continued his dance education at École supérieure de danse de Cannes Rosella Hightower in France.

== Recreation of the Iranian National Ballet Company ==
After freelancing in Europe, Kiann began an effort to reestablish the Iranian National Ballet Company in 1998. The project, taking five years to be realized, resulted in the 2001 foundation of Les Ballets Persans in Sweden. The dance company had its world premiere in 2002. L’Academie de Ballets Persans, the Forum of Persian and Middle Eastern Dance, and the European Youth Dance Project are educational programs established within Les Ballets Persans.

== Collaboration with national ballet companies in Central Asia ==
The world premiere of Les Ballets Persans included two full-length ballets (Babek and Seven Beauties - 2002) by Azerbaijani choreographers Rafiga Akhundova and Maksud Mamedov. These pieces were composed during the Soviet era and had not been performed since their exclusion from the repertoire of the National Ballet of Azerbaijan in the 1970's and 1980's. In 2012, Kiann was appointed Principal Guest Choreographer of the then recently reestablished National Ballet of Tajikistan. In 2014, Kiann organized the first international tour of the National Ballet of Kyrgyzstan in the West since the fall of the Soviet Union, as a collaboration between the Kyrgyz Ministry of Culture and Les Ballets Persans.

== Academic activities ==
Kiann has served as director of several cultural associations and manages Parnian Radio in Sweden as its founder and feature editor. He is the author of several multilingual scholarly papers about dancing in Iran, the Middle East and Central Asia: "Fate of Dance in Iranian Diaspora" (1999), "Persian Dance and Its Forgotten History" (2000), "Farhang-e nām va vāzheh-gizini barāye radeh-hā-ye bāleh dar zabān-e fārsi [Terminology and Equivalent Terms for Ballet Titles in Persian Language]" (2004), and "History of Ballet in Azerbaijan" (2005). He has served as artistic advisor for the Arts and Culture Festival of Tirgan in Canada, and the Culture Ministry of Kyrgyzstan.

== Recognition ==
On March 9, 2008, the Toos Foundation organized a gala performance at Logan Hall, University of London to celebrate Nima Kiann on his artistic endeavors and achievements in the promotion and realization of Iran's most extensive artistic project ever carried out outside of Iran. The gala performance included a seminar on 3000 years of Persian dance history, based on one of Kiann's articles.

Kiann was offered the Ferdowsi Award "for his untiring efforts to give life to a forgotten Iranian cultural and artistic heritage, and for recreating and reestablishing the Iranian National Ballet through his dance company of Les Ballets Persans".

== Choreographies ==
Moving Through Secrecy (1997)
Music: Iranian Orchestra for New Music

Femme (2002) - variation
Music: Hossein Alizadeh
Costumes: Nima Kiann

Separation (2002)
Music: Music: Majid Derakhshani
Vocal: Zohreh Jooya
Costumes: Doriz

Simay-Jan (2002) - variation
Music: Majid Derakhshani
Vocal: Zohreh Jooya
Costumes: Nima Kiann

Devine Banquet (2002)
Music: Shamss Ensemble
Vocal: Shahram Nazeri
Costumes: Nima Kiann

Femme (2003) - full-length ballet
Music: Hossein Alizadeh
Costumes: Nima Kiann

Les étoiles (2003)
Music: Majid Derakhshani
Vocal: Zohreh Jooya Costumes: Tahir Tairov

Papou-Soleymani (2004)
Music: Majid Derakhshani
Vocal: Zohreh Jooya
Costumes: Jamal

Bon Voyage (2004)
Music: Majid Derakhshani
Vocal: Zohreh Jooya
Costumes: Nima Kiann

Kaveh the Blacksmith (2004)
Music: Ahmad Pejman and Mohammad Shams
Vocal: Mario Taghadossi
Costumes: Jamal and Nima Kiann

Scheherazade (2004) - after Fokine
Music: Nikolay Rimsky-Korsakov
Orchestra: Persian International Philharmonic
Conductor: Alexander Rahbari
Costumes: Jamal

Simay-jan the Gilani Girl (2007) - full-length ballet
Music: Majid Derakhshani
Vocal: Zohreh Jooya
Costumes: Nima Kiann

Rumi Rumi (2008)
Music: Shamss Ensemble
Composer: Kaykhosro Pournazeri
Costumes: Nima Kiann

Turquoise Land - Dream of Peace (2008)
Music: Aref Ensemble
Composer: Parviz Meshkatian
Costumes & Tiara Design: Nima Kiann

Hanging Gardens of Lost Dreams (2008)
Music: Alexander Rahbari
Orchestra: Persian International Philharmonic
Conductor: Alexander Rahbari
Costumes: Nima Kiann

Symphony of Elegy (2009) - after Fokine
Music: Alexander Rahbari
Orchestra: Persian International Philharmonic
Conductor: Alexander Rahbari
Costumes: Nima Kiann

Vis and Ramin (2011)
Libretto: Maria Sabaye Moghaddam
Music: Peyman Soltani
Orchestra: Slovak National Symphony Orchestra
Conductor: Alexander Rahbari
Costumes & Tiara Design: Nima Kiann
