= Vis and Rāmin =

Persian epic poem

Vis and Rāmin (Persian: ويس و رامين, Vis o Rāmin) is a classical Persian romantic tale. The epic was composed in poetry by Fakhruddin As'ad Gurgani (or "Gorgani") in the 11th century. Gorgani claimed it had a Sasanian origin, but it is now regarded to be of Parthian origin, probably from the 1st century AD. It has also been suggested that Gorgani's tale reflects the traditions and customs of the era immediately before he himself lived. That cannot be ruled out, as stories retold from ancient sources often include elements drawn from the times of their narrators.

== Framework ==
The framework of the story is the opposition of two of the Great Parthian houses, one in the west and the other in the east. Gorgani originally belongs to Hyrcania which is one of heartlands of the Parthians. The existence of these small kingdoms and the feudalistic background point to a date in the Parthian era of Iranian history. The popularity of this pre-Islamic story in the Islamic period is mentioned by the poet himself, and shows that there was a demand for ancient themes and traditional lore.

== Synopsis ==
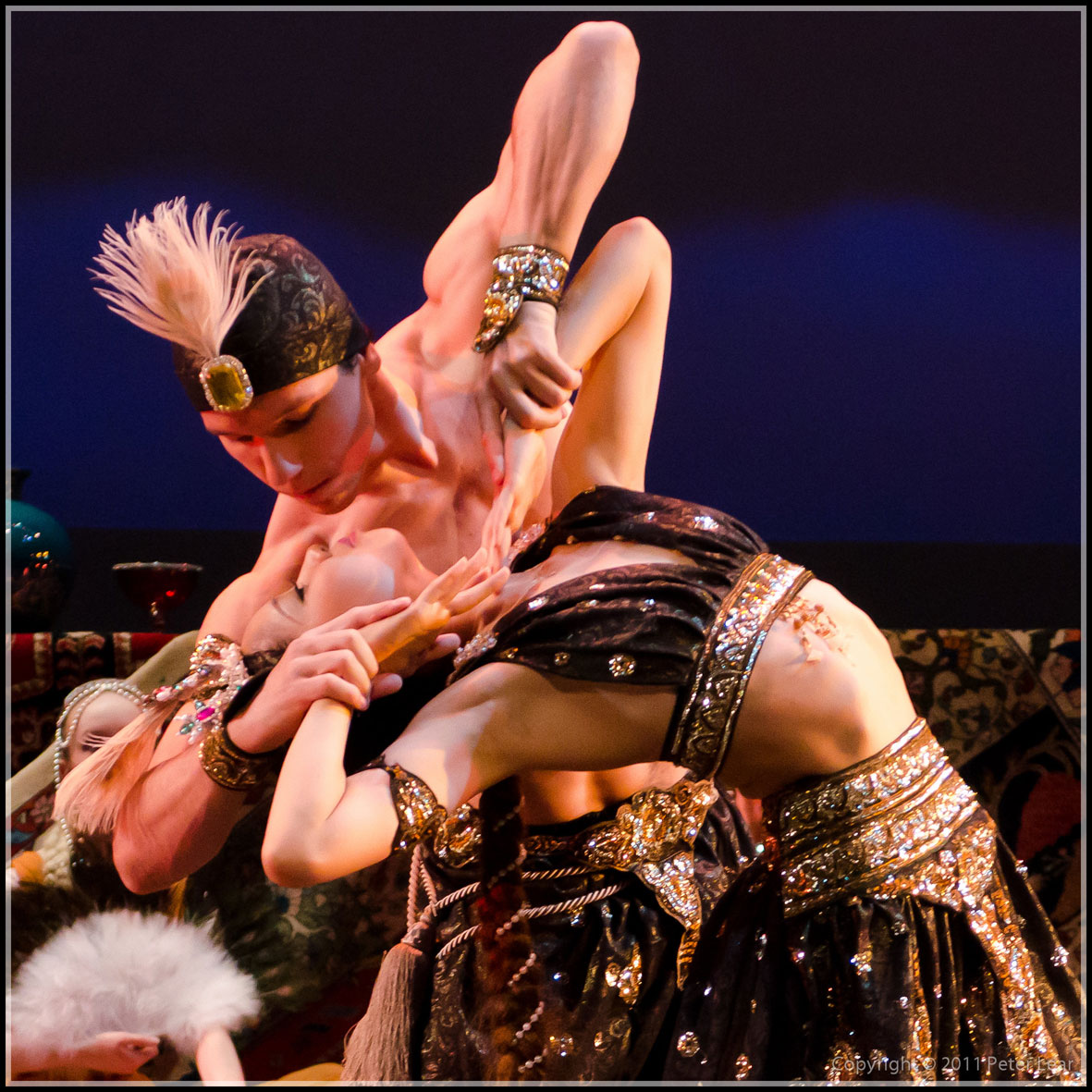
Vis and Ramin, Les Ballets Persans. Choreography by Nima Kiann. Tirgan Festival. Harbourfront Centre, Toronto. 2011

The story is about Vis, the daughter of Shāhrū and Qārin, the ruling family of Māh (Media) in western Iran, and Ramin (Rāmīn), the brother to Mobed Manikan, the King of Marv in northeastern Iran. Manikan sees Shāhrū in a royal gala, wonders at her beauty, and asks her to marry him. She answers that she is already married, but she promises to give him her daughter in marriage if a girl is born to her.

Shāhrū gives birth to a girl and calls her Vis (or Viseh). She sends the infant to Khuzan to be raised by a wet-nurse who also happens to be raising Ramin, who is the same age as Vis. They grow up together. When Vis reaches adolescence, she returns to her mother, who marries Vis to her brother Viru. The marriage remains unconsummated because of Vis' menstruation, which by Zoroastrian law makes her unapproachable. Manikan finds out about the marriage celebration and sends his brother Zard to remind Shāhrū of her promise to give him Vis as his wife. Vis rejects Manikan's request and refuses to go. An aggrieved Manikan leads an army against Māh-abad. Vis's father, Qārin, is killed in the ensuing conflict, and Manikan also suffers a defeat at the hands of Viru. Manikan then takes his army to Gurab, where Vis is awaiting the outcome of the battle. He sends a messenger to her, offering her various privileges in return for marrying him. Vis rejects Manikan's offer proudly and indignantly. Manikan asks advice from his two brothers - Zard and Ramin. Ramin, who is already in love with Vis, attempts to dissuade Manikan from trying to marry her. However, Zard suggests bribing Shāhrū as a way of winning over Vis. Manikan sends money and jewels to Shāhrū and bribes her to gain entry to the castle. He then takes Vis away, much to the chagrin of Viru.

On the journey back to Marv, Ramin catches a glimpse of Vis and is consumed with love for her, so much so that he falls off his horse and faints. Vis is given residence in the harem of Manikan and gifts are bestowed upon her. Vis's nurse also follows her to Marv, and attempts to persuade her to behave pragmatically, accept Manikan and forget Viru. Vis at first has a hard time accepting her fate, but eventually resigns herself to life in the harem.

Still mourning her father's death and her kidnapping, Vis refuses to give herself to Manikan for a year. Her nurse makes a talisman that renders Manikan impotent for one month. The spell can be broken only if the talisman is broken, and it is swept away in a flood and lost, so that Manikan is never able to sleep with his bride. Meanwhile, after many attempts to contact Vis, Ramin finally meets with her and the two consummate their love while Manikan is away at war.

When Manikan returns, he overhears a conversation between the nurse and Vis, and realizes Vis loves Ramin. Manikan demands that Vis prove her chastity by undergoing trial by fire. But Vis and Ramin elope. Manikan's mother makes peace between Ramin and the king, and they all go back to Marv.

Manikan takes Ramin along on a campaign against the Romans, but Ramin falls sick and is left behind. Ramin goes back to Vis, who is imprisoned in a castle by Manikan and guarded by Zard. Ramin scales the wall and spends his time with Vis until Manikan comes back from the war and Ramin escapes.

Ramin thinks that his love with Vis has no future, so he asks Manikan to send him to Maah on a mission. There, Ramin falls in love with a woman called Gol and marries her. Vis finds about this and sends her nurse to Ramin to remind him of their love. Ramin sends back a harsh reply. Vis sends an elaborate message pleading with him to come back. At this time, Ramin is bored from his married life and after he receives the second message he goes back to Vis. But when he reaches Marv on his horseback in a snow storm, Vis goes to the roof of the castle and rejects his love. Ramin goes off desperately. Vis regrets what she has done and sends the nurse after Ramin. They reconcile.

Manikan takes Ramin hunting while Vis and the nurse with some other women attend a fire temple nearby. Ramin leaves the hunt, disguises himself as a woman to enter the temple, and flees with Vis. They go back to the castle and, with help from Ramin's men, kill the garrison and Zard as well. They then escape to Dailam, on the coast of the Caspian Sea. Manikan is killed by a boar during the hunt. Vis and Ramin come back to Marv and Ramin sits on the throne as the king and marries Vis. Ramin reigns for more than 80 years. In the 81st year of Ramin's reign, Vis dies and Ramin hands over the kingdom to his eldest son with Vis and goes and mourn on Vis' tomb for 2 years, after which he joins her in the afterlife.

== Influence ==
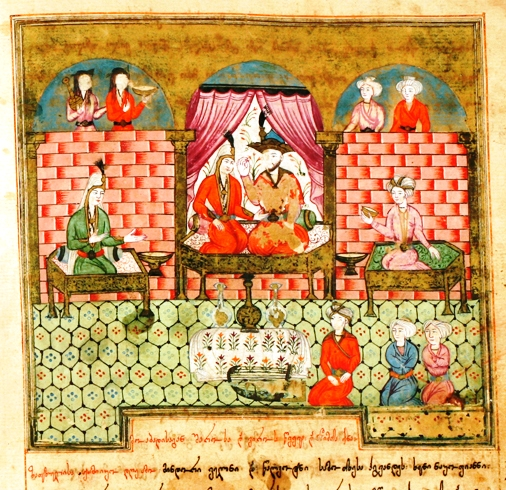
A Persianate miniature from the 1729 manuscript of the Georgian adaptation of Vis and Rāmin.

The tale of Vis and Ramin had a noticeable influence on Persian literature. Significantly, Nizami Ganjavi, himself a major poet of Persian romantic traditions, took the bases of much of his rhetoric from Gorgani.

The romance also has had its influence beyond Persian culture. The story became very popular in Georgia through a 12th-century free translation in prose known as Visramiani, which had a longlasting effect on Georgian literature. Being the oldest known manuscript of the work and better preserved than the original, it is of great importance for the history of the Persian text and helps restore several corrupted lines in the Persian manuscripts.

Vladimir Minorsky did a four-part study of the story and was convinced of its Parthian origin.

Some scholars have suggested that Vis and Ramin may have influenced the Tristan and Iseult legend, and the two plots have distinct resemblances. Nevertheless, views have differed about the connection between these two stories.

== Excerpt ==
An excerpt where the beauty of Vis is described:

چو قامت بر کشید آن سرو آزاد
که بودش تن ز سیم و دل ز پولاد
خرد در روی او خیره بماندی
ندانستی که آن بت را چه خواندی
گهی گفتی که این باغ بهارست
که در وی لالهای آبدارست
بنفشه زلف و نرگس چشمکانست
چو نسرین عارض لاله رخانست
گهی گفتی که این باغ خزانست
که در وی میوهای مهرگانست
سیه زلفینش انگور ببارست
زنخ سیب و دو پستانش دونارست
گهی گفتی که این گنج شهانست
که در وی آرزوهای جهانست
رخش دیبا و اندامش حریرست
دو زلفش غالیه، گیسو عبیر است
تنش سیمست و لب یاقوت نابست
همان دندان او درّ خوشابست
گهی گفتی که این باغ بهشتست
که یزدانش ز نور خود سرشتست
تنش آبست و شیر و می رخانش
همیدون انگبینست آن لبانش
روا بود ار خرد زو خیره گشتی
کجا چشم فلک زو تیره گشتی
دو رخسارش بهار دلبری بود
دو دیدارش هلاک صابری بود
بچهر آفتاب نیکوان بود
بغمزه اوستاد جادوان بود
چو شاه روم بود آن ری نیکوش
دو زلفش پیش او چون دو سیه پوش
چو شاه زنگ بودش جعد پیچان
دو رخ پیشش چو دو شمع فروزان
چو ابر تیره زلف تابدارش
بار اندر چو زهره گوشوارش
ده انگشتش چو ده ماسورهء عاج
بسر بر هر یکی را فندقی تاج
نشانده عقد او را درّ بر زر
بسان آب بفسرده بر آذر
چو ماه نَو بر او گسترده پروین
چو طوق افگنده اندر سرو سیمین
جمال حور بودش، طبع جادو
سرینِ گور بودش، چشم آهو
لب و زلفینش را دو گونه باران
شکر بار این بدی و مشکبار آن
تو گفتی فتنه را کردند صورت
بدان تا دل کنند از خلق غارت
وُ یا چرخ فلک هر زیب کش بود
بر آن بالا و آن رخسار بنمود

Translation:

She grew into a silver cypress tree,
Her heart was steely, and her spirit free,
And Wisdom gazing on her lovely face
Was baffled to describe her radiant grace.
It said, "She is a garden burgeoning
With all the freshness of the early spring,
Her eyes are two narcissi, and her hair
The purple violets darkly nestled there,
Her face is formed from tulips and wild roses."
But then it said, "It's autumn that composes
Her loveliness, not spring, and she is made
Of fruits that ripen in autumnal shade:
Her hair is clustered grapes, her breasts now show
The shape of pomegranates as they grow,
Her chin is like an apple, sweet and round."
And then it said, "In this sweet girl is found
The riches all the world desires, and she
Is like a wealthy royal treasury:
Her skin is silk, her face is rich brocade,
Her hair the essence from which scents are made,
Her body's made of silver, and beneath
Her ruby lips peep priceless pearls, her teeth."
And then it said, "But God has formed her of
His own refulgence, and celestial love,
And in her body all components meet
That make the walks of paradise so sweet,
The water and the milk, her cheek's red wine,
The honey of her lips, are all divine."
It's no surprise if Wisdom missed the mark,
Since heaven's eye, in seeing her, grew dark.
Her cheeks would steal spring's heart, when Patience spied
Her lovely eyes it sighed for them and died;
Her face was like the sun, in coquetry
She was the mistress of all sorcery.
Like some pale Western king, her face was white;
Her braids were guards, dressed blackly as the night,
And, like a royal African's, her hair
Glowed from her cheeks' bright torches, burning there.
Her curls were like a black cloud, and amid
Its darkness Venus, her bright earrings, hid.
Her fingers were ten reeds of ivory,
Their nails were filberts fitted cunningly,
Her necklace was like ice that coalesced
Upon the conflagration of her breast,
As though the splendid Pleiades were strewn
Across the shining surface of the moon,
As though a glittering torque should somehow be
Fitted around a silver cypress tree.
She was a houri in loveliness,
In inward strength she was a sorceress,
Her eyes were doe's eyes, and you'd say that her
Plump rump belonged upon an onager.
Her lips rained sugar down, and everywhere
She walked musk wafted from her perfumed hair;
And you would say that subtle mischief made
Her face to plunder hearts as its cruel trade,
Or that this lovely creature had been given,
All of the beauty that was owned by heaven.

— Translated by Dick Davis

== Metre ==
Gorgani's poem is composed in the hazaj meter, one of the seven Persian metres traditionally used for writing long poems. The 11-syllable line has this structure:

u – – – | u – – – | u – –

u = short syllable; – = long syllable

The first couplet of the extract quoted above reads as follows:

 u  – –   –   u –  –   –   u  – –
čo qāmat bar kešīd ān sarv-e 'āzād
 u  –  –   –   u  –  –  –   u  – –
ke būd-aš tan ze sīm ō del ze pūlād

The same metre is used in Nezami's romantic epic Khosrow and Shirin, completed in 1192.

== See also ==
- Shahnameh (Iran's national epic book)
- Firdowsi (Writer of Shahnameh)
- Persian literature
- Persian mythology

== English translations ==
- Gurgānī, Fakhr al-Dīn (1972). Vīs and Rāmīn. UNESCO Collection of Representative Works: Persian heritage series. Vol. 14. Translated by Morrison, George. New York: Columbia University Press. ISBN 0-231-03408-3.
- Gorgani, Fakhraddin (2009). Vis and Ramin. Translated by Davis, Dick. Penguin Classics. ISBN 978-0-14-310562-6.
