= Fakhruddin As'ad Gurgani =

Persian poet

Fakhruddin As'ad Gurgani, also spelled as Fakhraddin Asaad Gorgani (Persian: فخرالدين اسعد گرگانی), was an 11th-century poet. He versified the tale of Vis and Rāmin, a story from the Arsacid (Parthian) period. The Iranian scholar Abdolhossein Zarrinkoub, however, disagrees with this view, and concludes that the story has its origins in the 5th-century Sasanian era. Besides Vis and Rāmin, he composed other forms of poetry. For example, some of his quatrains are recorded in the Nozhat al-Majales.

== Biography ==
Fakhruddin As'ad Gorgani was born in Jorjan or Gorgan (Persian: گرگان, also Romanized as Gorgān), the central city of Hyrcania in northern Iran, to a Persian family.

Gorgani accompanied the Seljuk ruler Tughril I during his campaigns in Iran. When Tughril seized Isfahan from the Kakuyids in 1051, he appointed Amid Abu'l-Fath Muzaffar as its governor. Gorgani thereafter settled in Isfahan, where he established good relations with its governor, who took him under his protection.

One day, when Gorgani and Abu'l-Fath Muzaffar were talking, Abu'l-Fath Muzaffar asked the following question: “What do you say about the tale of Vis and Rāmin?” Gorgani then told him that the story was only written in Middle Persian. Abu'l-Fath Muzaffar then asked Gorgani to versify the story, which he did; during the Mehregan festival, Gorgani presented the poem to him, in which he praises Tughril, the vizier Abu Nasr Kunduri, and Abu'l-Fath Muzaffar. Gorgani died c. 1058.

== Influence ==
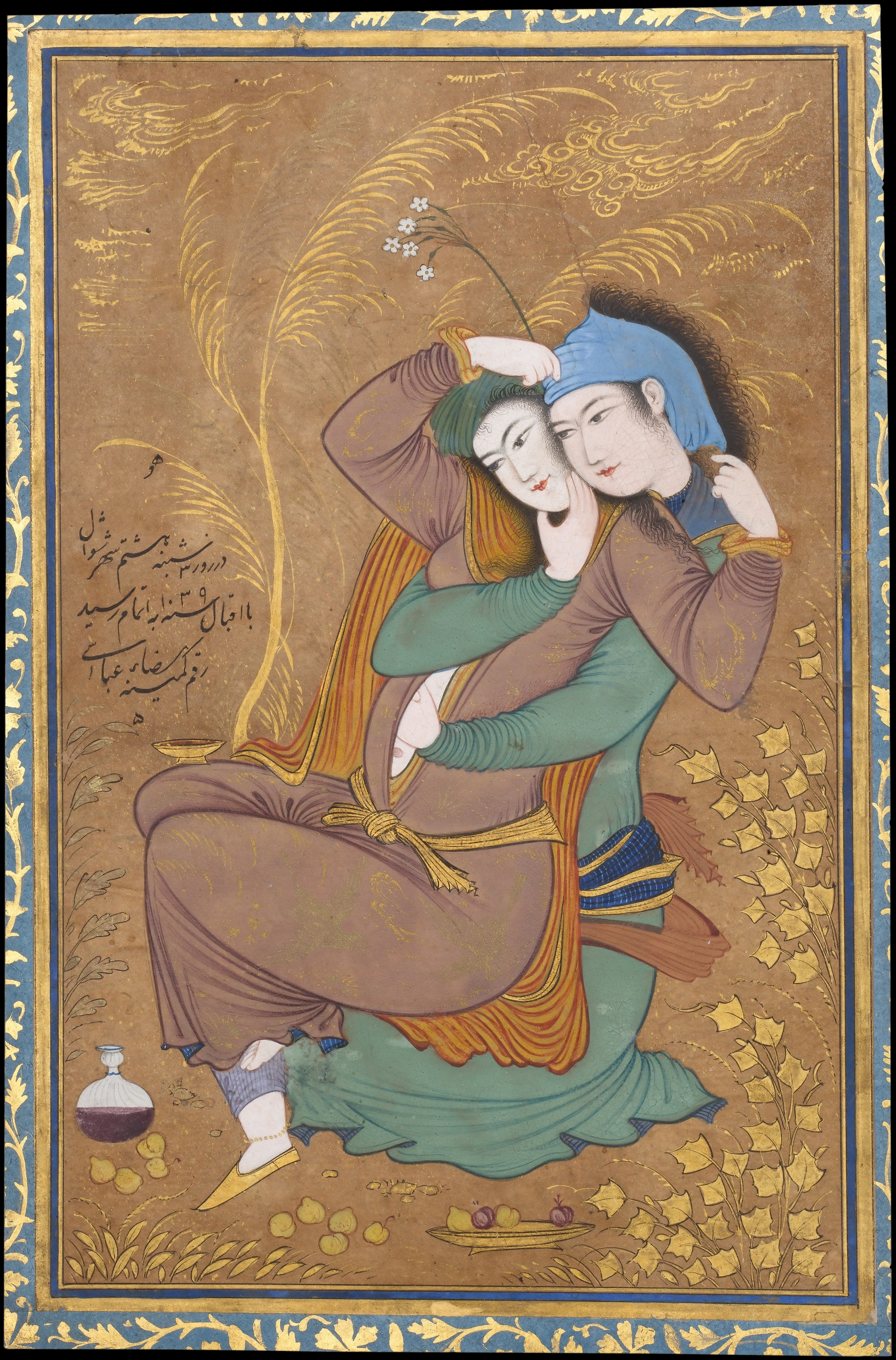
"The two lovers." A Persian miniature painting by Reza Abbasi.

The tale of Vis and Ramin had a noticeable influence on Persian literature. Significantly, Nezami Ganjavi, himself a major poet of Persian romantic traditions, took the bases of much of his rhetoric from Gorgani. The romance also has had its influence beyond Persian culture. The story became very popular in Georgia through a 12th-century free translation in prose known as Visramiani, which had a long-lasting effect on Georgian literature. Being the oldest known manuscript of the work and better preserved than the original, it is of great importance for the history of the Persian text and helps restore several corrupted lines in the Persian manuscripts.

Some scholars have suggested that Vis and Ramin may have influenced the Tristan and Iseult legend, and the two plots have distinct resemblances. Nevertheless, views have differed about the connection between these two stories.

== Sources ==
- Gorgani, Le roman de Vis et Ramin, traduit par Henri Massé, Société d'Edition Les Belles Lettres, Paris 1959
- Jan Rypka, History of Iranian Literature. Reidel Publishing Company. ISBN 90-277-0143-1 OCLC 460598 LCC PK6097.R913 ASIN B-000-6BXVT-K
- Vīs and Rāmīn, by Fakhr al-Dīn Gurgānī, translated from Persian by George Morrison, UNESCO Collection of Representative Works: Persian heritage series, no. 14, xix, 357 p. (Columbia University Press, New York, 1972). ISBN 0-231-03408-3.
- Pierre Gallais, Genèse du roman occidental. Essais sur Tristan et Iseut et son modèle persan, Sirac, Paris 1974
- Gorgani, Fakhraddin. Vis and Ramin Trans. Dick Davis. Washington DC: Mage, February 2008 ISBN 1-933823-17-8. Now available as a Penguin Classic ISBN 0-14-310562-0
- Nahid Norozi, Esordi del romanzo persiano. Dal Vis e Ramin di Gorgani (XI sec.) al ciclo di Tristano, preface by F. Benozzo, Mimesis Edizioni, Roma 2021
- Meisami, Julie Scott (2002). "GORGĀNI, FAḴR-AL-DIN ASʿAD". Encyclopaedia Iranica, Vol. XI, Fasc. 2. pp. 162–163.
