= Les Ballets Persans =

Les Ballets Persans سازمان باله ایران

General information
- Name: Les Ballets Persans سازمان باله ایران
- Predecessor: Iranian National Ballet Company سازمان باله ملی ایران
- Year founded: 2002
- Founders: Nima Kiann
- Website: BalletsPersans.org

Artistic staff
- Artistic director: Nima Kiann

Other
- Official school: l’Académie de Ballets Persans

Les Ballets Persans (Persian: سازمان باله ایران) is the successor company and the recreation of the former Iranian National Ballet Company (Persian: سازمان باله ملی ایران). Based in Sweden as a non-profit and non-governmental organization, Les Ballets Persans is an internationally touring dance ensemble founded by Nima Kiann, the Iranian born Swedish dancer, ballet master, choreographer and dance scholar. Les Ballets Persans is also known as The New Iranian National Ballet and has been regarded as the most extensive artistic Iranian project ever realized in exile.

Since its establishment in 2002, Les Ballets Persans has been collaborating with national ballet ensembles of former USSR countries. The company has within its own productions introduced and promoted national ballet companies of Azerbaijan, Tajikistan and Kyrgyzstan in the West for the first time after these countries’ independence following the fall of the Soviet Union.

== History ==
=== Revival of the Iranian National Ballet in Les Ballets Persans ===
The project and concept of recreating the former Iranian National Ballet Company was introduced by Nima Kiann in 1998. During the forthcoming five years, a great number of cultural and artistic organizations, authorities, royalties, art patrons, cultural personalities, etc. were approached throughout Europe and the United States. Inspired by the legendary Ballets Russes and Ballets Suedois, Les Ballets Persans was formed in exile to create inventive choreographies on three foundations; 1) reflecting the Iranian history, culture and heritage through the means of dance on historical, mythological, folkloric and social themes, 2) to create choreographies that are based entirely on classical ballet technique but include and adapt new movement vocabulary of Persian dance, and 3) reviving an oblivion ballet heritage, not only in Iran and after the disbanding of the Iranian National Ballet, but also in the neighboring countries that share the same cultural heritage with Iran.

=== Founders’ Circle ===
In order to implement the administrative tasks of the project and making preparations for the establishment of the new dance company, a Founder's Circle was formed in 2000 consisting of Marian Laurell (former managing director of Cullberg Ballet), Lia Schubert (the grand lady of Swedish ballet and founding director of the Ballet Academies in Stockholm, Gothenburg and Haifa), Dr. Karl Ryberg (a dance connoisseur and psychologist) and Nima Kiann among other members. The Foundation of Les Ballet Persans was registered in Sweden in 2001.

Considered as a vast integration and remarkable artistic project, the organization received funds from intercultural sponsors and various Swedish authorities such as Swedish National Office for Cultural Affairs, National Integration Office of Sweden, Cultural Administration of Stockholm County Council.

Marita Ulvskog, the Culture Minister of Sweden expressed her admiration towards Kiann's efforts through a letter on February 21, 2000: ... Please allow me to express my admiration for the energy and purposefulness with which you are equipped in order to pursue this project. To give life to an artistic tradition after more than twenty years of interruption demands a willpower of the kind that only an indomitable yearning can give. This yearning to recreate what there has been, can be difficult to understand for us, who are not sharing the painful experience that often is behind.

=== World Premiere performance ===
The World Premiere of Les Ballets Persans included four choreographies of Nima Kiann and two full-length ballets (Babek and Seven Beauties - 2002) of prominent Azerbaijani choreographers Rafiga Akhundova and Maksud Mamedov. The Azeri masterworks were created during the Soviet Era and had fallen into oblivion since their excerption from the repertoire of the National Ballet of Azerbaijan (Azerbaijan State Academic Opera and Ballet Theater) in the 1970s and 1980s. Babek (1986, music: Akshin Alizadeh) is a Spartacus like heroic ballet based on the story of Babak Khorramdin. The ballet was staged by Les Ballets Persans for the first time in the West. Seven Beauties (1978, music: Kara Karaev), a one-act ballet based on Haft Peykar, the romantic epic of Nezami Ganjavi, a Persian 12th century poet. Les Ballet Persans had its World Premiere on October 7, 2002, at Cirkus Theatre in the Royal Djurgården, a late 19th century theater venue in the historical part of Stockholm. The premiere production of the company involved 106 individuals from 22 nationalities.

=== Political attack on the dance company ===
The dance company was unwillingly drawn into a political conflict between Azerbaijan, Iran and Sweden during its world premiere production. The conflict was provoked by an Iranian-Azerbaijani separatist movement. (See the Notes below) The movement based in Stockholm and active under the name of a cultural organization (Azerbaijan National Association, in Azerbaijani: Azərbaycan Federasiyasi İsveç), came into contact with Les Ballets Persans's office a few weeks before the company's world premiere performance and claimed that by staging two ballets created by Azeri choreographers, Les Ballets Persans has attempted to confiscate national heritage of Azerbaijan. The association, being linked to the movement of Seyyed Ja'far Pishevari, made laud protests in the Media, provoked a verbal conflict between Azerbaijan, Sweden and Iran and tried to disturb the production by threatening the dance company and its participating artists and dancers.

While the Azerbaijan National Association in Stockholm denied in the Iranian, Swedish and international Media any political agenda and connection to political sources in Baku, its representative in the Azerbaijanian capital inflamed the Ministry of Culture and some radical nationalistic cultural figures against Les Ballets Persans and the initiated collaboration between Azeri and Iranian artists. The separatist movement demanded that a flag of Azerbaijan Republic would be put up in the proscenium during the performance. The demand was denied by the company and the separatist movement's leader, Ali Mullazadeh, threatened over a telephone conversation the day before the world premiere “to terminate and take down this dance company by any means and at any price”. As the protests were intensifying with anguish reaction of Azerbaijanian officials as result, Tomas Bolme the President of the International Federation of Actors (FIA) along with representative of the Swedish Cultural Department, and Swedish prominent dance artists addressed letters of support in favor of Les Ballets Persans’ non-political and pure artistic intentions to Heydar Aliyev, the president of Azerbaijan Republic and the country's Ministry of Culture. The intensity of the protest of the separation movement never decreased when the company was on tour. A group of demonstrators (even few in number but aggressively loud) gathered in front of the venues in which Les Ballets Persans was performing. Flyers with political message were handed out among visitors. Consequently, Les Ballets Persans’ tour was discontinued which caused economic difficulties for the company. Two weeks after the cancelation of Les Ballets Persans international tour, the company was reorganized and started a new production. Les Ballets Persans’ second production including the ballet of Femme, choreographed by Nima Kiann and the ballet to become the company's signature work, was staged at the Stockholm Concert Hall on May 5, 2003, seven months after the company's world premiere production.

As a result of the disturbing protests of the Azerbaijanian separatist movement and their threats, the two Azeri ballets (Babek and Seven Beauties) were immediately excluded from the repertoire of Les Ballets Persans. When the situation had calmed down in Baku, the Azerbaijanian separatist movement whose actions were condemned by cultural elite of Azerbaijan received massive critics for spoiling a much needed chance for receiving publicity for Azerbaijanian culture and arts in the West. Les Ballets Persans’ presentation of the Azeri ballets was however the first chance for Azerbaijani artists and choreographies to be presented outside of the country after the fall of the Soviet Union and the newly gained independence of the country. The officials of the Ministry of Culture were also criticized for their inappropriate statements and unprofessional handling of the case.

Since the exclusion of the two Azeri ballets from Les Ballets Persans’ repertoire, Babek has never been staged again either inside or outside Azerbaijan by National Ballet of Azerbaijan or any other company. Seven Beauties was reproduced in 2009 on the occasion of the 90 years anniversary of Kara Karaev, the composer of the ballet. As a recognition of the efforts of People's artists of Azerbaijan, Rafiga Akhundova and Maksud Mamedov, National Television of Azerbaijan broadcast the recording of Les Ballets Persans’ world premiere performance.

== Repertoire ==
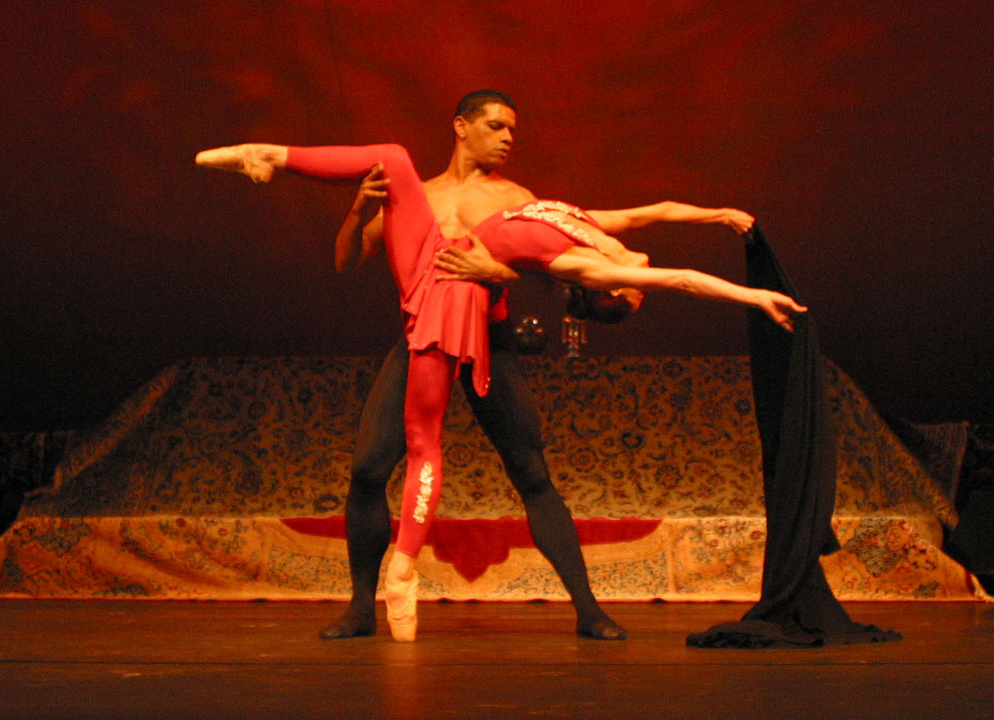
Ballet of Femme. A signature work of Les Ballets Persans. Choreography by Nima Kiann. Stockholm Concert Hall. 2003

Les Ballets Persans repertoire is limited to new or already existing choreographic creations of neo-classical and contemporary ballets that have a distinct connection to the Iranian heritage in terms of music, story, folklore and literature. It strives to become a platform for exploring the ties between artistic creativity and dramatic social issues such as war, dislocation, exile, and artistic suppression. The company repertoire does not include any work of the international classical ballet repertoire. Works are having a unified theme: pieces are often one act, and always sought to express a single theme throughout the piece.

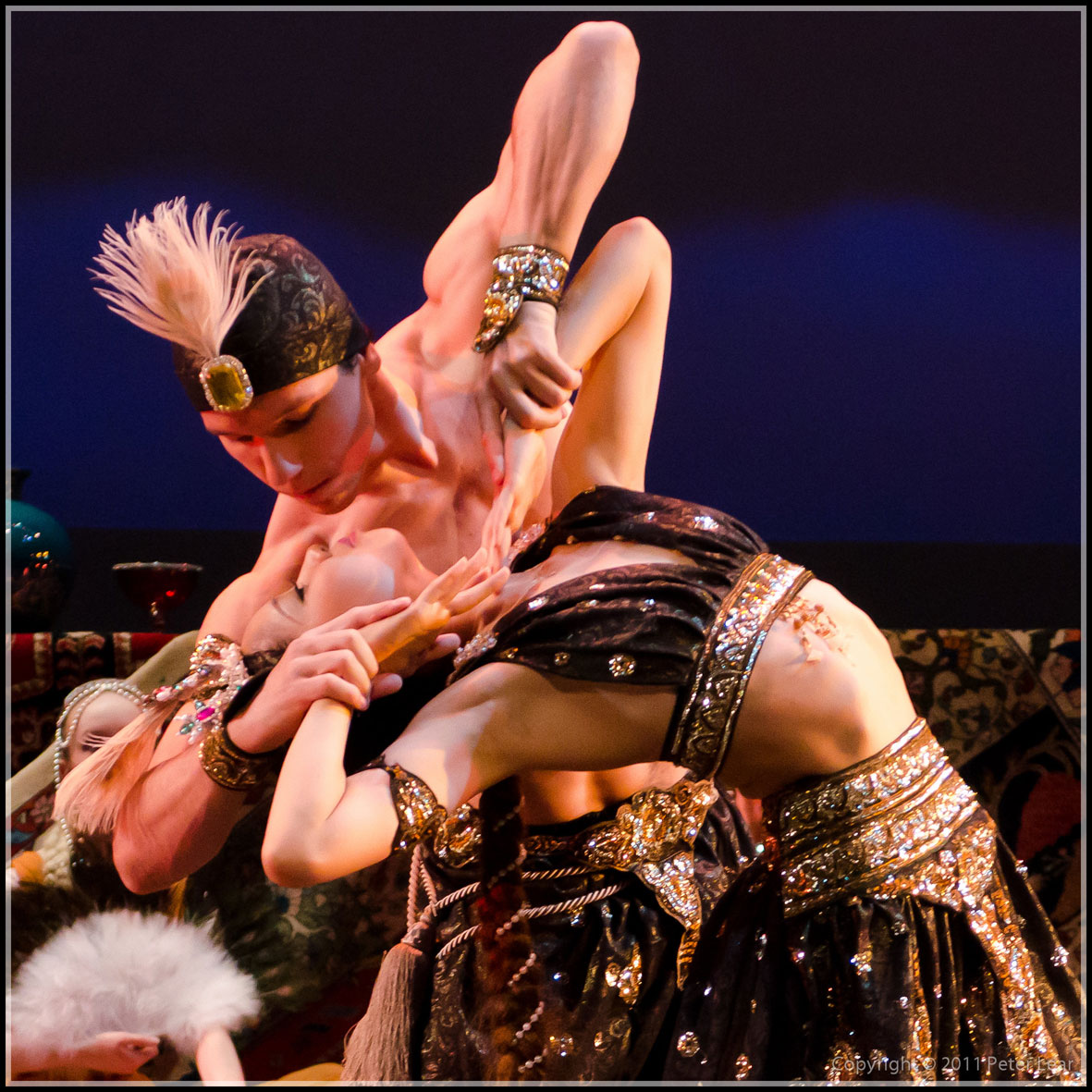
Vis and Ramin. Choreography by Nima Kiann. Tirgan Festival. Harbourfront Centre, Toronto. 2011

Besides the two Azerbaijanian ballets, Babek and Seven Beauties, another piece; Flamenco on Persian Rhythms (2004, choreography: Gabriela Gutarra) all other choreographies until 2014 were created by Les Ballets Persans’ founder and principal choreographer. One of the most characteristic ballets of Les Ballets Persans’ repertoire and the company's signature work; Femme (2003, music: Hossein Alizadeh), is a one-act contemporary piece on the eternal unity of man and woman. The technically demanding pas de deux reflects the sorrow of Iranian women through the centuries: their beauty, femininity and untiring campaign for freedom and equality. At the finale, a new era arises: the era of enlightenment. The man and the woman are united but as equals. Based on a tale from Shahnameh, Kaveh-The Blacksmith (2004, music: Ahmad Pejman) is another heroic ballet about the old blacksmith who led the rebellion of the people against the tyranny of the evil king Zahhāk. His son Pour-Kāveh is arrested by Zahhak's men, but Kaveh heroically frees his son and other young prisoners by making a banner of his apron and leading the uprising. For the first time, classical ballet was choreographed on traditional Persian music in Turquoise Land – Dream of Piece (2007, Music: Parviz Meshkatian). The piece was exclusively created for the event of the “Celebration of the Works and Achievements of Nima Kiann”, presented in London on March 9, 2008. Hanging Gardens of Lost dreams (2008, music: Dastan Ensemble), a video and dance installation drama, was created in collaboration with photographer Rahim Karimi. The metaphorical contemporary dance in one act and ten following scenes is an autobiography of the choreographer.

Vis and Ramin (2011, music: Peyman Soltani) was staged during the 3rd biennial of Tirgan Festival in Toronto, Canada (The largest Iranian festival in the World). The story is based on the poems of Fakhruddin As’ad Gurgani (11th century Persian poet), an epic mythical love story between two young lovers that sacrifice name, family and social obligations for each other. Created for the National Ballet of Tajikistan as the company's first contemporary piece, Symphony of Elegy (2012, music: Alexander (Ali) Rahbari) is a metaphorical contemporary ballet based on the roots and rituals of lamentation and elegy in the Iranian culture. Recital of an elegy is mainly a performing tradition based on Shahnameh called “Naghāli.” In this dramatization, the storyteller dies in sorrow of reciting the elegy.

The company repertoire includes a number of choreographies that represent Persian character dance, merging Persian folklore dance with the classical ballet technique such as Simay Jan (2002 and a new version in 2007), Papou-Soleymani (2004), Bahareh! (2014) and Bahar Gelir (2014). Other notable pieces in the company repertoire are Separation (2002), Divine Banquet (2002) and Rumi, Rumi (2008) which are contemporary interpretations of the ritual dance of Sama and concepts of Sufism, Scheherazade (2004) choreographed after Michel Fokine of Les Ballets Russes, and Golden Dreams'(2014) illustrating the famous and beloved piano piece of the late master composer and pianist Javad Maroufi, khābhā-ye talāee in a pas de deux.

== Artistic staff ==
The project of recreating the disbanded Iranian National Ballet Company was the most intercultural Iranian artistic project ever carried through. The majority of choreographies included in Les Ballets Persans’ repertoire are created by the company's principal choreographer Nima Kiann. Some other prominent choreographers have however contributed with new works. Since the establishment of Les Ballets Persans, a large number of nationalities from more than 32 countries representing all five continents have participated in company productions. Many of former company members and participants of the EYDP are now engaged in national ballet companies or renowned dance troupes and institutions all around the world; David Hovhannisyan (Milwaukee Ballet, USA), Asuka Inoue (Salzburg Ballet, Austria - Stadttheater Giessen, Germany), Hazmik Amirian-Bennet (Marat Daukayev School of Ballet - USA), Ledian Agalijaj (freelancer dance icon, Albania), Angelina Allen (Gothenburg Opera Ballet, Sweden), Julia Davies (Ballet Theatre UK, England), Adolfo Chavez (Streamingdance, Mexico) to name but a few.

== Dance research and scholarly department ==
The lack of any reference centre for research on the history and background of dance and particularly ballet in Middle East and Central Asia and also as a scholar contribution, motivated company's artistic director, Nima Kiann, to promote a dance research department in 2004 in order to create a forum for research. The Forum of Persian and Middle Eastern Dance offers scholarly papers, research material, theoretical articles and a collection of information and links. The forum has become an important source of information for research on classical ballet in Middle east and Central Asia.

== European Youth Dance Project ==
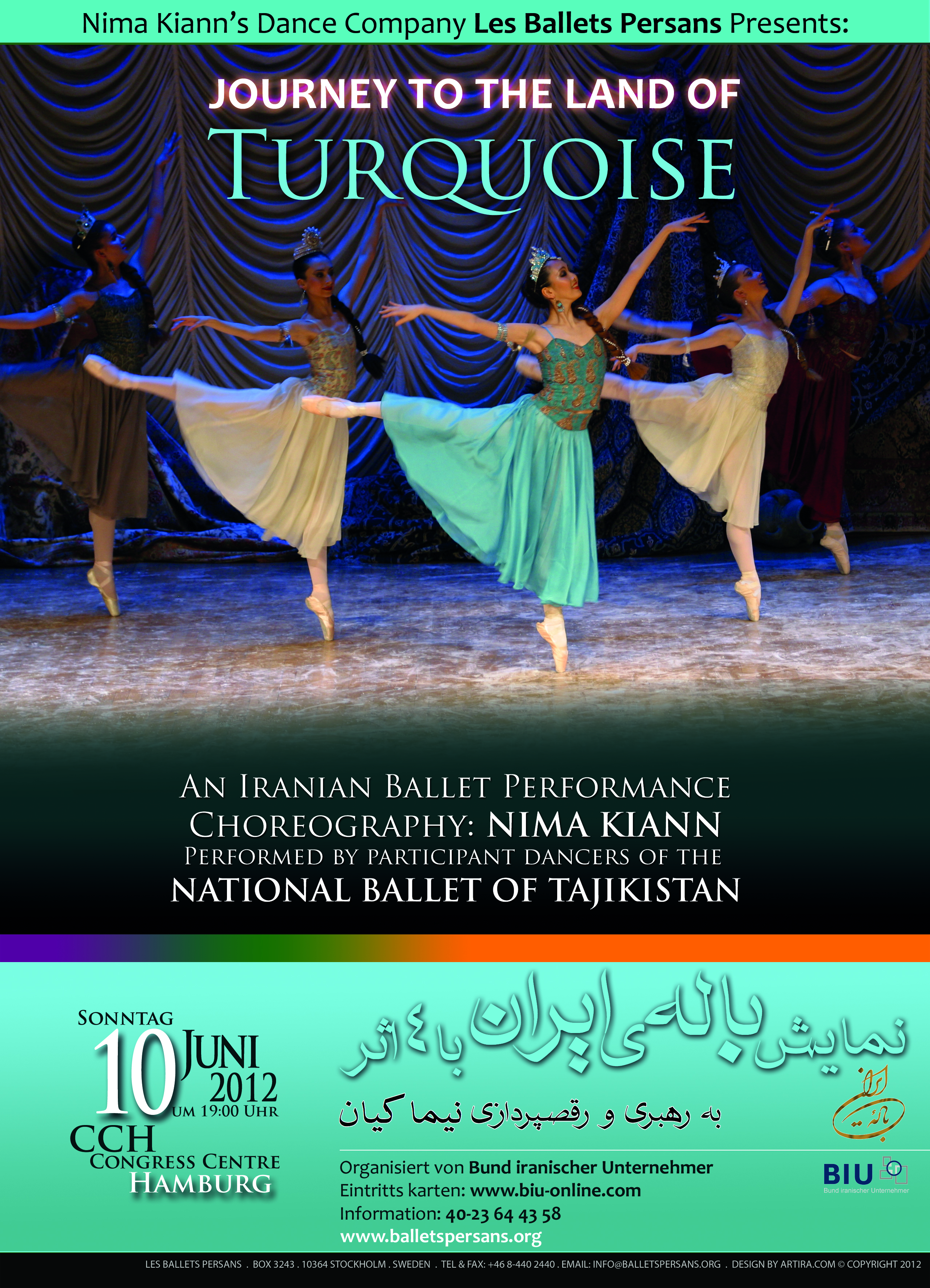
Journey to the Land of Turquoise. National Ballet of Tajikistan performing the repertoire of Les Ballets Persans on its first appearance in the West after the fall of Soviet Union. Poster. 2012

Originally intended to engage dancers within the European Union, the European Youth Dance Project (EYDP), an integration, peace and intercultural project for young ballet dancers, was introduced in the fall season of 2007. Soon the project made an international impact and dancers from all around the world took part. The project aimed to engage young dancers at the start of their professional careers in the process of producing a ballet performance offering practice and experience, working with a thematic repertoire. Participating dancers ranges today from pre-professional dancers to internationally recognized professional ballet artists.

== l’Académie de Ballets Persans ==
Les Ballets Persans has conducted dance seminars and courses since 2005, when the academy (l’Académie de Ballets Persans) of the company started operating. The organization is also arranging master classes in classical ballet for professional dancers in Sweden and abroad as a link to company tours and lectures/conferences given by the Nima Kiann.

== Les Ballets Persans and national ballet companies of former USSR countries ==
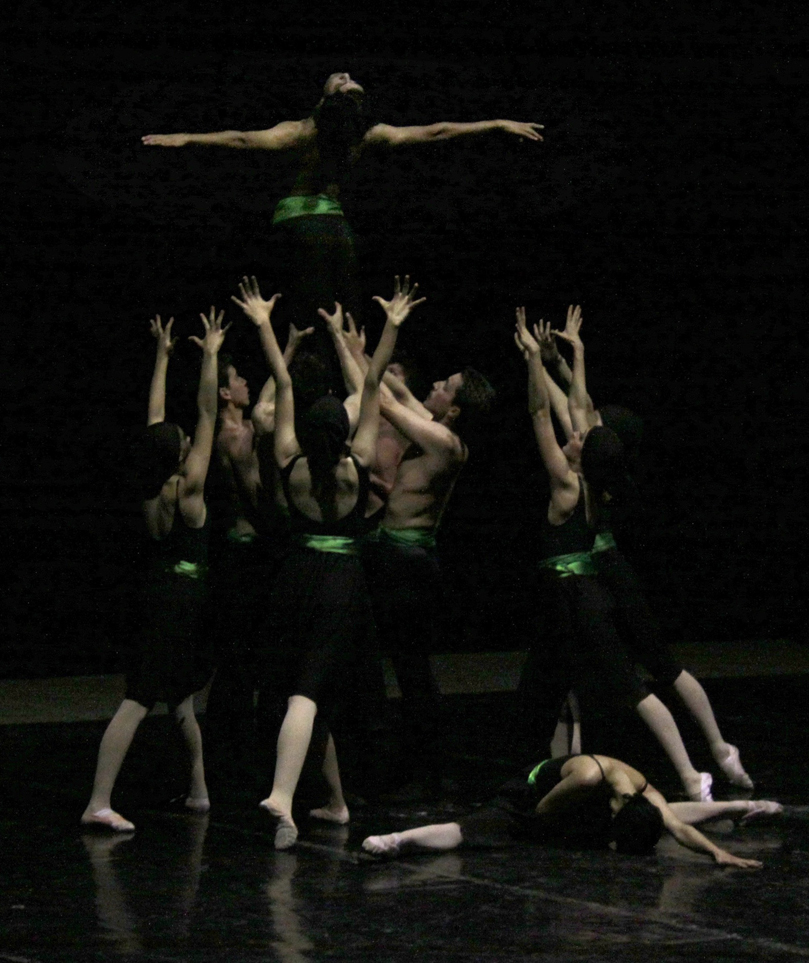
Symphony of Elegy. Choreography by Nima Kiann for National Ballet of Tajikistan. Dushanbe Opera House. 2012

Les Ballets Persans has established a close collaboration with the ballet artists and national ballet companies of Central Asian countries since its inception. It aims to invigorate the ties of artistic exchange between ballet veterans and different ballet traditions in the region. The in-depth collaboration with prominent choreographers of Azerbaijan, reviving their forgotten works of the Soviet era, and national ballet companies of Kyrgyzstan, Tajikistan, etc. is a venture towards this direction.

== Notes ==
- The Iranian Azerbaijan is not to be mixed with the Republic of Azerbaijan. While the Iranian province of Azerbaijan is a region in northwestern Iran, the Republic of Azerbaijan is an independent state bordering the Iranian Azerbaijan province. The Republic of Azerbaijan belonged to the Iranian territorial domains until 1812, when the region was lost to Russia after a short war and through the Treaty of Gulistan. The region, ruled by different khanates, were incorporated into the Russian Empire in 1813. Azerbaijan Democratic Republic proclaimed its independence in 1918 after the breakdown of the Russian Empire following the Bolshevik revolution but lasted only 23 months until the Bolshevik 11th Soviet Red Army invaded it. The country was then incorporated into the Soviet Union in 1920 as the Azerbaijan Soviet Socialist Republic. After the collapse of the Soviet Union the country gained its independence in 1991.
- The Azerbaijan People's Government, established in Iranian Azerbaijan and headed by Ja'far Pishevari as its president, was a communist puppet state and a short-lived government in northern Iran from November 1945 to November 1946. After the reentering of the Iranian Army to Tabriz, the capital of the proclaimed Azerbaijan People's Government, many of the leaders including Ja'far Pishevari took refuge in the Azerbaijan Soviet Socialist Republic. Pishevari, who was never fully trusted by Stalin, soon died in a car accident under mysterious circumstances. The movement was kept alive in Azerbaijan SSR during the entire Soviet era and was reactivated after the Islamic Revolution in Iran. A large number of former members and activists of the Firqah-i Dimukrat, or Azerbaijani Democratic Party which was behind the formation of the Azerbaijan People's Government migrated to Western countries after the fall of the Soviet Union. The Azerbaijanian separatist movement in Stockholm consists of sympathizers of the Pishevari movement.

== See also ==
- Vahdat Hall
