= Iranian National Ballet Company =

Iranian state ballet institution founded in 1958

Iranian National Ballet Company سازمان باله ملی ایران

General information
- Name: Iranian National Ballet Company سازمان باله ملی ایران
- Successor: Les Ballets Persans; Persian: سازمان باله ایران
- Year founded: 1958
- Founder: Nejad Ahmadzadeh
- Founding choreographers: William Dollar
- Principal venue: Roudaki Hall Opera
- Website: BalletsPersans.org

Senior staff
- Assistant director: Haideh Ahmadzadeh

Artistic staff
- Artistic director: Nejad Ahmadzadeh (1958–1976); Ali Pourfarrokh (1976–1979)
- Resident choreographers: William Dollar; Miro Zolan; Richard Brown; Robert de Warren; Jack Carter; Anne Heaton; Haideh Ahmadzadeh; Robert Urazgildiev; Birgit Cullberg; Ali Pourfarrokh; John Butler

Other
- Sister company: National and Folk Music, Song and Dance Ensemble
- Orchestra: Tehran Symphony Orchestra
- Official school: National Ballet Academy of Iran
- Formation: Principal Dancer; First Soloist; Second Soloist; Corps de Ballet; Apprentice

The Iranian National Ballet Company (Persian: سازمان باله ملی ایران) was Iran's only state ballet institution until the Islamic revolution of 1979 and also the most known and recognized of all dance companies in the Middle East. It was founded in 1958 by the Iranian Ministry of Culture and existed for 21 years (1958–1979). The company, residing at Tehran's Roudaki Hall, was disbanded in the aftermath of the Islamic revolution and was re-established 23 years later in exile by Nima Kiann under the name of Les Ballets Persans (Persian: سازمان باله ایران) in Sweden.

== History ==
=== Introduction of ballet in Iran ===
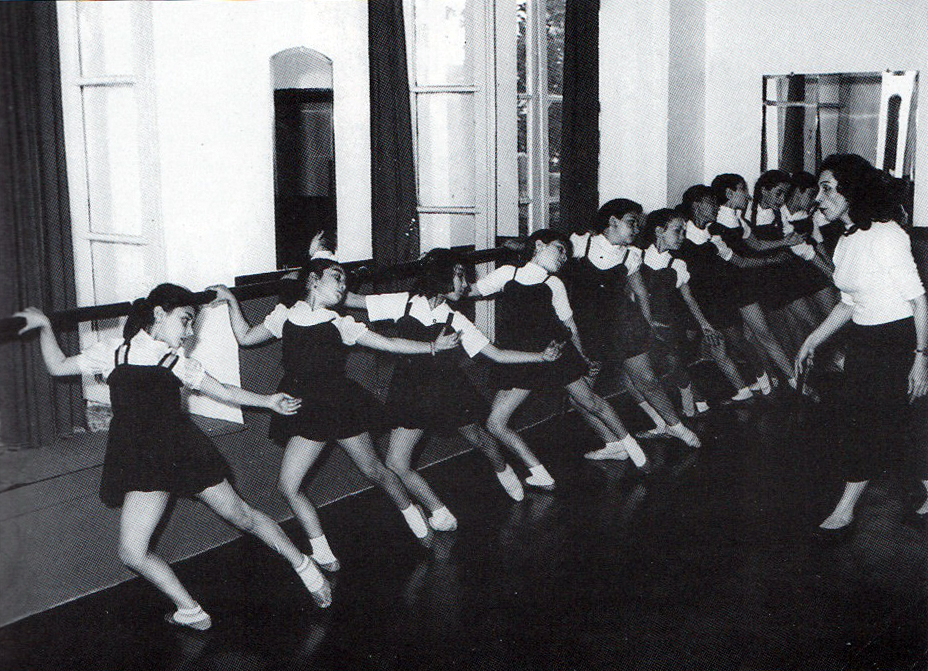
Madame Yelena's ballet class in Tehran, 1949

The history of ballet in Iran started in 1928 when Madame Cornelli, a Russian immigrant who fled the Bolshevik revolution of 1917, started giving dance lessons in Tehran. There was no methodical ballet training; the classes consisted of various exercises to make the body supple and to cultivate the students' awareness of rhythm and musicality. Part of each class was devoted to character or folk dances. A later dance teacher was Madame Yelena (Avedisian), and Sarkis Djanbazian who respectively in 1933 and 1938 organized dance classes in the city of Tabriz and Qazvin. These newcomers expanded the European influenced dance scene in Iran by holding performances and dance classes of various style, including classical ballet, European folk dancing, and the European partner dancing.

=== Iran’s pioneering ballet company ===
In the early 1940s Nilla Cram Cook, who had vast knowledge in Eastern cultures and languages, was serving as the United States cultural attaché at the American Embassy in Tehran. During her time as the US cultural attaché she became employed at the Ministry of Education and Propaganda, as director general of the Arts Department. Her endeavors and great interest in Persian culture, arts and literature resulted in the realization of the most extensive Iranian national dance project of the first half of the twentieth century. In 1946, Cram Cook founded the Studio of the Revival of the Iranian Ancient Arts (in Persian: استودیوی احیای هنرهای باستانی ایران), aiming to revive and restore the "forgotten" ancient Iranian performing arts. Most of the dances were based on Persian history or mythology. An important work by Cram Cook, The Caravan, was developed from a poem by Saadi and was later performed in 1958 by the Iranian National Ballet. The dance troupe performed at functions at the American Embassy in Tehran and toured nationally and internationally, remaining active until around 1953.

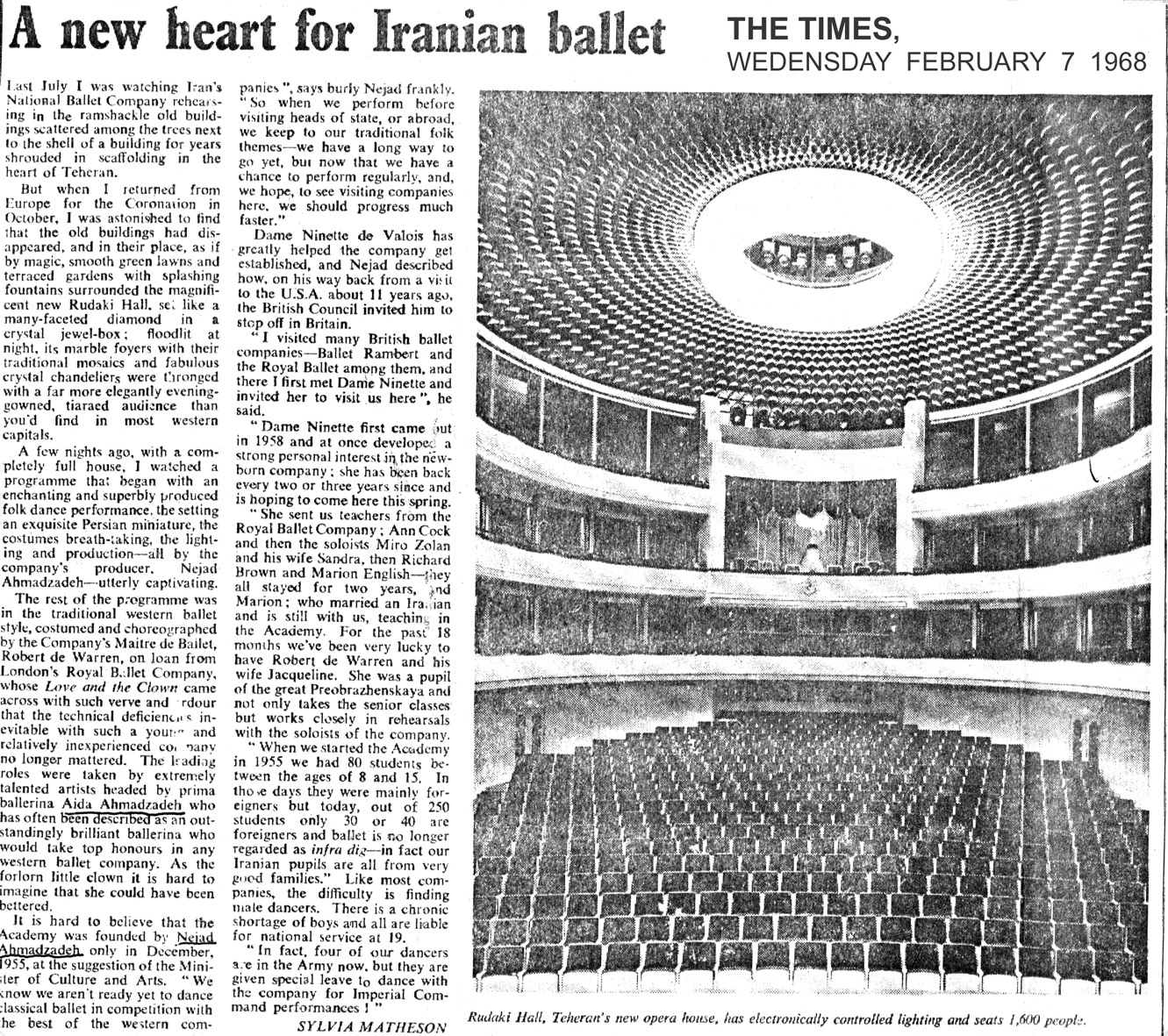
The Times newspaper review of the newly built Roudaki Hall Opera. 7 February 1968

=== Establishment of the national ballet company ===
In 1955, Mehrdad Pahlbod, the head of the Fine Arts department commissioned Nejad and Haideh Ahmadzadeh to start a ballet school on a professional basis aiming to raise native Iranian ballet dancers for a future national ballet company. The school was opened in 1956 in the premises of Tehran's Conservatory of Music. Two years later in 1958, the Iranian National Ballet Company was established with Nejad Ahmadzadeh as its founding director. When the Fine Arts Department of Iran eventually expanded and became The Ministry of Culture and Arts, Nejad Ahmadzadeh was appointed as director of the ballet academy, the ballet company and the National and Folk Music, Song and Dance Ensemble which was a sister company to the Iranian National Ballet Company using the same dancers to create and stage a nationally inspired repertoire.

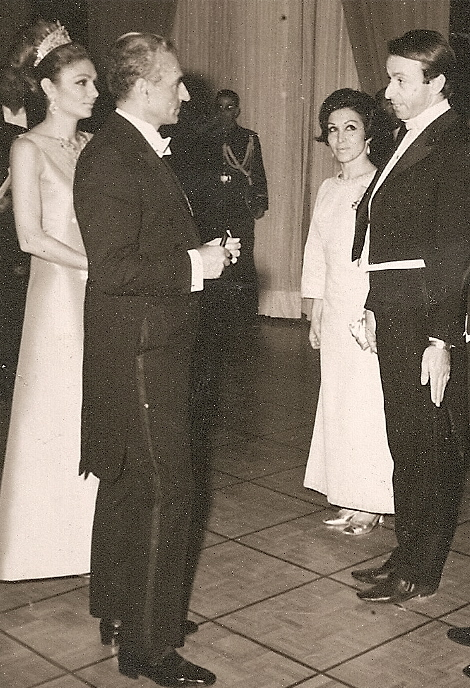
Robert de Warren and Haideh Ahmadzadeh conversing with the Shah and Empress Farah at the Roudaki Hall Opera. 1967

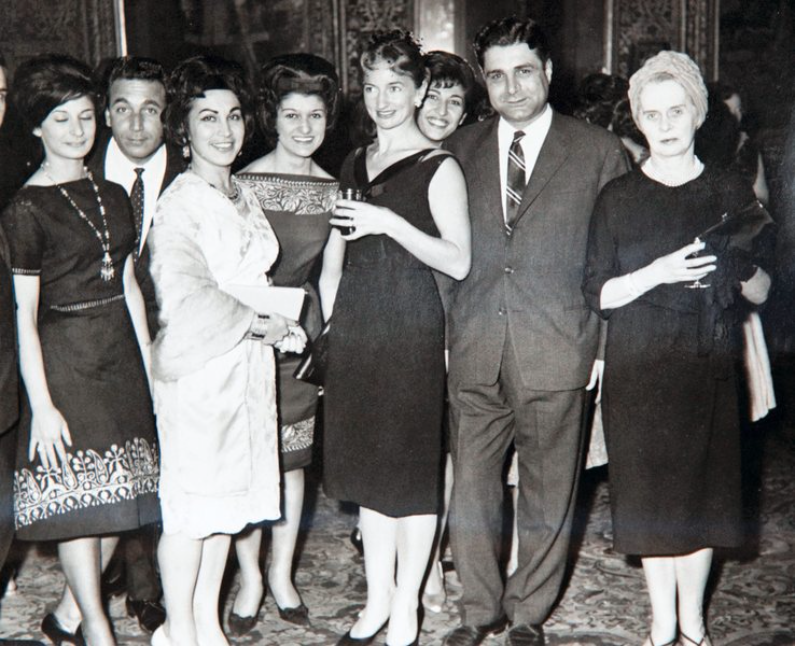
Dame Ninette de Valois (far right) on one of her visits to Tehran at a cocktail party with Nejad Ahmadzadeh, Sandra Vane (centre) and Haideh Ahmadzadeh. 1962

As institutionalizing ballet and bringing about a professional national ballet ensemble comparable to the ballet companies in the West had become a serious concern for the government, the Iranian monarch Mohammad Reza Shah Pahlavi had personally asked Dame Ninette de Valois to council on the formation of a ballet company during one of his official visits to London and after a command performance in his honor at the Royal Opera House. In the summer of 1958, Dame Ninette de Valois was visiting Turkey where she had founded a ballet school. On the invitation of the Ministry of Culture and Arts, she prolonged her trip in order to visit the National Ballet Academy of Iran and budding company in Tehran. On her return to London, she sent Ann Cox followed by Miro Michael Zolan and his wife Sandra Vane. Later Nicholas Beriozoff, Marion English-Delanian, Richard Brown and finally Robert and Jacqueline de Warren were sent by de Valois to teach and stage dances and short ballets for the ballet academy and company.

The Iranian National Ballet Company developed to become the most renowned Iranian cultural institution during its tenure as the country's only ballet institution. Company productions were often performed at official events and functions in the presence of the royal family and invited national and international dignitaries. The company moved to the Roudaki Hall Opera upon its completion in 1967.

== Repertoire ==
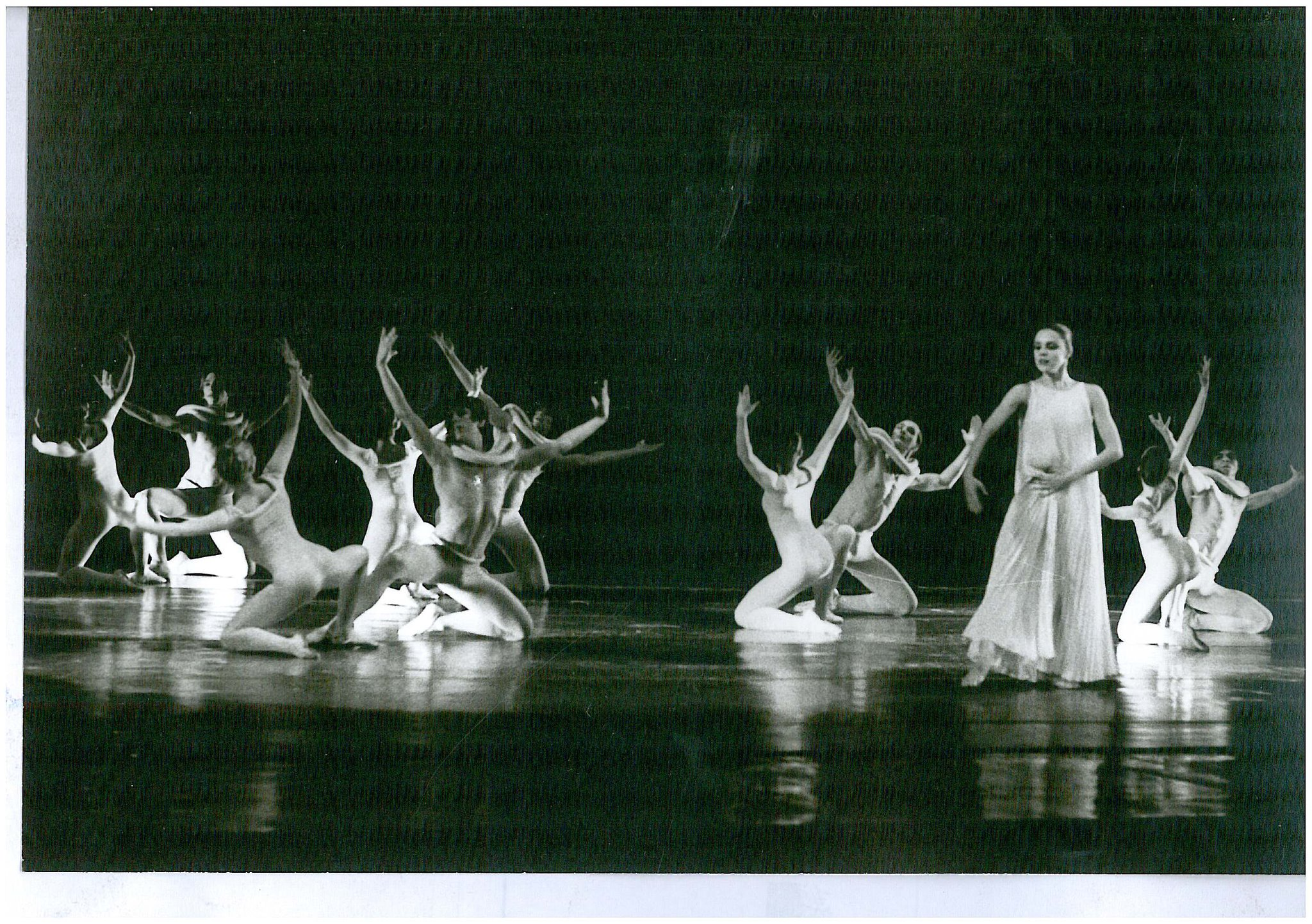
Iranian National Ballet Company performing Carmina Burana, 1978

The company repertoire included classical, neoclassical and contemporary ballets which were staged usually by invited guest choreographers and ballet masters from Europe and the United States. The company established a close collaboration with dance institutions in Soviet Union, United States and Europe. The Royal Ballet, Royal Academy of Dance, Bolshoi Ballet, American Ballet Theatre were parts of a vast exchanging cultural program between the companies.

Some early works of the company were those choreographed by Nilla Cram Cook for the Revival of the Iranian Ancient Arts Ensemble which were restaged by Cram Cook's former dancers, Nejad and Haideh Ahmadzadeh. Prominent and world-famous ballet dancers from renowned ballet companies of the world were often invited to dance the principal roles of all great classical ballets. In order to keep the high standard of the productions the company relied on guest artists from abroad to perform the leading roles in most work premieres.

=== List of Iranian National Ballet Company productions ===
Year / Season	Work	Composer	Chore / Staged by	Principal dancers
1958	The Caravan	Unknown	Nilla Cram Cook / Haideh Ahmadzadeh	
1961	The Classical Première	Gluck	Miro Zolan	
1961	1+2=4	Ravel	Miro Zolan	Avak Abrahamian
1961	Don Quixote Pas de deux	Minkus	Miro Zolan	Haideh Ahmadzadeh & Miro Zolan
1961	Rossiniada	Rossini	Miro Zolan	
1961	Fiesta	Kabalevsky	Sandra Vane / Miro Zolan	
1962	Libestraum	Strauss	Miro Zolan	
1962	The Entertainers		Miro Zolan	
1963	The Nutcracker Pas de deux	Tchaikovsky	Marius Petipa / Miro Zolan	Haideh Ahmadzadeh & Leon Neshanian
1963	Comedie a la Francaise	Ibert	Richard Brown	
1963	Slaughter on Tenth Avenue	Rogers	George Balanchine / Richard Brown	Clara Avanessian
1964	La Péri	Paul Dukas	Ivan Clustine / Robert de Warren	Haideh Ahmadzadeh & Leon Neshanian
1965	Love and the Clown	Verdi	John Cranko / Robert de Warren	Haideh Ahmadzadeh, Avak Abrahamian, Jamshid Saghabashi
1966	Games	Ahmad Pejman	Robert de Warren	
1966	La Valse	Ravel	Robert de Warren	
1966	Symphony in C	Bizet	Robert de Warren	
1966	Tchaikovsky Suite	Tchaikovsky	Robert de Warren	
1967	Lady of the Camellias		/ Robert de Warren	
1967	The Firebird	Stravinsky	Michel Fokine / Robert de Warren	
1968	Phaedra	Auric	/ Robert de Warren	Haideh Ahmadzadeh & Robert de Warren
1968–69	Romeo and Juliet	Prokofiev	John Cranko / Robert de Warren	Sarvar Kaboli & Amin Taati
1968–69	Cinderella	Prokofiev	/ Robert de Warren	Sarvar Kaboli & Amin Taati
1969–70	The Sleeping Beauty	Tchaikovsky	Marius Petipa / Robert de Warren	Lucette Aldous & Robert Bestonso (Note: from Royal Ballet)
1970–71	Giselle	Adolphe Adam	Jean Coralli & Jules Perrot / Anne Heaton	Adele Oroz & Viktor Rohna, (Note: from Budapest Opera Ballet followed by Irina Prokofyeva & Andrei Kondratoff from Bolshoi Ballet) Haideh Ahmadzadeh & Jamshid Saghabashi
1971 – Autumn	The Myth of Creation (Note: on the occasion of the 2,500 year celebration of the Persian Empire)	Melik Aslanian	Robert Thomas	
1971–72	Coppélia	Léo Delibes	Arthur Saint-Léon / Anne Heaton	Philippa Caire & Amin Taati, Haydeh Changizian & Jamshid Saghabashi
1971–72	Swan Lake	Tchaikovsky	Marius Petipa / Vakhtang Chabukiani	
1971–72	The Nutcracker	Tchaikovsky	Marius Petipa / Jack Carter	Carol Grant & Jamshid Saghabashi, Haydeh Changizian & Amin Taati
1972–73	Lieder eines fahrenden Gesellen	Gustav Mahler	Robert Thomas	Haydeh Changizian & Amin Taati / Marion English Delanian & Robert Thomas
1972–73	La Bayadère	Ludwig Minkus	Marius Petipa / Natalie Conus (Note: from Bolshoi Ballet in Moscow, even known as Natalia Konus)	Malika Sabirova & Mozaffar Burkhanov (Note: soloists of Bolshoi Ballet from Tajik origin) /Haydeh Changizian & Amin Taati, Haideh Ahmadzadeh in role of Gamzatti
1972–73	Unfinished Symphony (Pas de quatre)	Franz Schubert	Madjid Kashef	Haydeh Changizian & Riccardo Duse
1973–74	Fountain of Bakhchisarai	Boris Asafyev	Rostislav Zakharov / Natalie Conus	Raisa Strouchkova & Nikolai Fadeyechev , (Note: from Bolshoi Ballet) Maggie Burton Saghabashi & Amin Taati, Haydeh Changizian, Avak Abrahamian
1973–74	La Fille Mal Gardée	Peter Ludwig Hertel	Dimitri Romanoff	Haydeh Changizian & Amin Taati, Haideh Ahmadzadeh as Widow Simone
1973–74	Boléro	Maurice Ravel	Madame Tilda from Romania	
1973–74	Petrushka	Igor Stravinsky	Michel Fokine / Madame Tilda from Romania	Jamshid Saghabashi
1973–74	Sinfonietta	Leoš Janáček	Miro Zolan	Haydeh Changizian
1973–74	Jigsaw	Boris Blacher	Miro Zolan	Haydeh Changizian
1973–74	The Scarecrow	Benjamin Britten	Miro Zolan	Marion English Delanian & Avak Abrahamian
1973–74	The Witch Boy	Leonard Salzedo	Jack Carter	Haydeh Changizian & Jamshid Saghabashi
1975–76	Les Sylphides	Frédéric Chopin	Michel Fokine / Anne Heaton	
1975–76	Schéhérazade	Rimsky-Korsakov	Michel Fokine / Anne Heaton (ballet dancer)|Anne Heaton	Haydeh Changizian as Zobeide, Jamshid Saghabashi as the golden slave, Avak Abrahamian as Kalif
1975–76	Bijan and Manijeh (Note: The company’s first full-length classical ballet production based on Shahnameh of Ferdowsi)	Hossein Dehlavi	Haideh Ahmadzadeh & Robert Urazgildiev	Haydeh Changizian & Jamshid Saghabashi
1976–77	Serenade	Tchaikovsky	George Balanchine / Patricia Neary	Janet Popeleski & Michael Dane
1976–77	Miss Julie	Rangström	Birgit Cullberg	Janet Popeleski & Chinko Rafique
1976–77	Graduation Ball	Johann Strauss II	/ Nicholas Beriosoff	Maggie Burton Saghabashi & Chinko Rafique
1976–77	Swan Lake	Tchaikovsky	Marius Petipa & Lev Ivanov / Nicholas Beriosoff	Maggie Burton Saghabashi & Jamshid Sahabashi, Janet Popeleski
1977–78	Romeo and Juliet	Prokofiev	/ Nicholas Beriosoff	Janet Popeleski & Robert Craset / Nina Brzorad and Jamshid Saghabashi
1977–78	The Nutcracker	Tchaikovsky	Marius Petipa / Nicholas Beriosoff	Janet Popeleski & Robert Craset / Nina Brzorad and Jamshid Saghabashi
1977–78	Carmina Burana	Carl Orff	John Butler	Janet Popeleski, Nina Brzorad, Robert Craset, Jamshid Saghabashi
1977–78	After Eden	Holby	John Butler	Janet Popeleski & Robert Crazet / Nina Brzorad and Jamshid Saghabashi
1977–78	Polovetsian Dances	Borodin	/ Nicholas Beriosoff	
1978–79	Sleeping Beauty	Tchaikovsky	Marius Petipa / Nicholas Beriosoff	Nina Brzorad, Patricia Rensetti, Jamshid Saghabashi

== Artistic staff ==
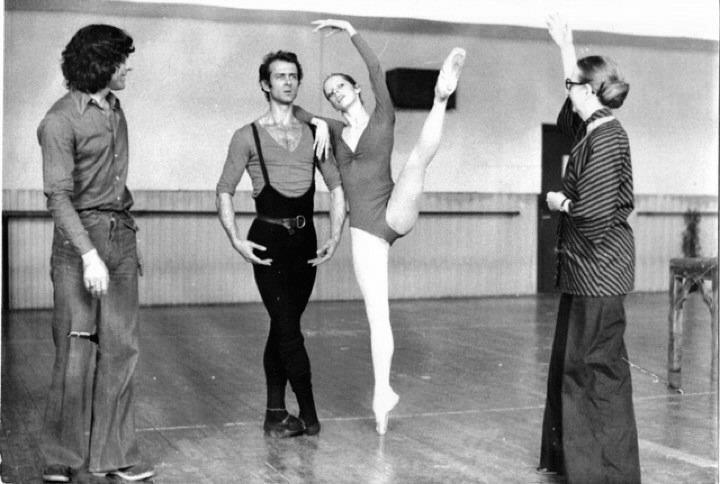
Birgit Cullberg (right) rehearsing Miss Julie with dancers of the Iranian National Ballet Company. Ali Pourfarrokh on the left, 1977

The Iranian National Ballet Company started operating in 1958 with a dozen of dancers. The company grew to approximately 50 dancers, one third of them Iranian natives. The rest of the company members came mostly from Europe and the United States.

=== Artistic directors ===
- Nejad Ahmadzadeh (1958–1976)
- Ali Pourfarrokh (1976–1979)

=== Principal choreographers ===
- William Dollar (1958–1960)
- Miro Zolan (1961–1963)
- Richard Brown (1963–1964)
- Jack Carter (1971)
- Anne Heaton (1973)
- Haideh Ahmadzadeh
- Robert Urazgildiev (1975)
- Birgit Cullberg (1975)
- Nicholas Beriosoff (1976–1979)
- John Butler

=== Ballet masters and mistresses ===
- William Dollar
- Miro Zolan
- Sandra Vane
- Yvonne Patterson (1959–1960)
- Marian English Delanian (1960 -1979)
- Robert de Warren (1965–1970)
- Jacqueline de Warren (1965–1970)
- Dudley Davies (1977–1979)
- Kenneth Mason (1976–1979)

=== Dancers ===
1. Ayda Abolian
2. Avak Abrahamian (Salmasi) (? – 1979)
3. Valerik Abrahamian (? – 1979)
4. Ahmad Adjdadi
5. Adeleh Afrand
6. Haideh Ahmadzadeh (1958–1975)
7. Parvin Al-Amin
8. Ronald K. Alexander
9. Anne Allen (1978–1979)
10. Jeremy Allen (1976–1979)
11. Avisa Amirshahi
12. Jenous Amirshahi
13. Mary Apick
14. Ahita Ardalan
15. Azita Arfa
16. Wendy Arshamian (? – 1979)
17. Minoo Atabaki
18. Clara Avanessian
19. Ophelia Azarnia
20. Banafsheh Bahramian
21. Georgina Bahramian Coleman (? – 1979)
22. Nejdeh Bahramian (? – 1979)
23. James Bailey (1977–1978)
24. Evelyn Balassanian (? – 1979)
25. Mitra Behrouz
26. Diana Biggart
27. Nina Brzorad (1976–1979)
28. Pippa Buck Power
29. Aban Budin
30. Margaret Bull
31. Judyth Casey
32. Haydeh Changizian (1972–1978)
33. Tina Christina
34. Robert Craset (1977–1979)
35. Michael Dane
36. Belinda (Lindy) Davies (? – 1979)
37. Rosamund Davies
38. Otis Daye (1977–1978)
39. Rostam Dehmohbed
40. Missy Denman (? – 1978)
41. Yerjanik Djambazian
42. Mehdi Doagoo
43. Gavin Dorrian (1978–1979)
44. Tomas Edwards (Martini) (? – 1978)
45. Magdy El-Lethy (? – 1979)
46. Jonathan Ellingham (1977–1979)
47. Bahman Sadr Orafai
48. Hilda Estepanian
49. Fereshteh Fakoor
50. Fereshteh Farazmand
51. Ivan Ionathan Feller
52. Martin Fredmann
53. Parviz Ghanei (? – 1979)
54. Farihan (Fari) Gheissari Akbarian
55. Diane Gray (? – 1979)
56. Michael Hall
57. Mark Hammond (1977–1978)
58. Mary Heathcote
59. Caroline Heming (1977–1978)
60. Dariush Hirbodian
61. Behrooz Honarbakhsh
62. Sarah Inglis Fricker (1970–1974)
63. David Jackson (1976–1978)
64. Nader Jahanfard
65. Sarvar (Sorur) Kaboli
66. Nina Kavosi
67. Nasser Kazemi
68. Sudabeh Keshmirian
69. Sholeh Katherina Kia
70. Shideh Kia Nikkhoo (? – 1979)
71. Ladan Kianpoor
72. Jeremy Macdonald (1977–1978)
73. Osama Maksood (1978–1979)
74. Robert March (1976–1977)
75. Debbie McGee (1978–1979)
76. Sam McManus
77. Terri Mills Tester
78. Frieda Minassian
79. Golriz Mirjahangiri
80. Nader Mirzadeh
81. Rima Moghadam
82. Farnoosh Moshiri
83. Abdollah Nazemi
84. Leon Neshanian
85. Jaleh Nikpay
86. Judith (Judy) Odell (1976–1978)
87. Karen Oram
88. Gita Ostovani
89. Gregory Pope (1977–1978)
90. Mary Paranicas (1977–1978)
91. Janet Popeleski (1976–1978)
92. Virginia (Ginny) Portz
93. Tibor Pusztai – Conductor
94. Mina Rad
95. Chinko Rafique (? – 1977)
96. Jaleh Rahbar
97. Soheyla Razavi (? – 1979)
98. Patricia Renzetti (1978–1979)
99. Helen Riddington (1976–1978)
100. Amanda Rivera Bruell (? – 1978)
101. Vivien Rycroft Richards (? – 1979)
102. Soheila Sadr
103. Jamshid Saghabashi (1958–1979)
104. Fereydoon Saghabashi Tork
105. Maggie (Burton) Saghabashi (? – 1979)
106. Pari Samar
107. Bahareh Sardari (? – 1979)
108. John (Jay) Seaman (1977–1979)
109. Susan Sepehran
110. Roberta Senn Minto (1977–1978)
111. Karen Smith (1977–1978)
112. Azar Snider
113. Sacha Spencer-Moore
114. Diane Spinelli
115. Clair Symonds Josephs
116. Amin Taati
117. Mersedeh Tahvildari
118. Mary Tarverdian
119. Kent Taylor (1978)
120. Peggy Tehran
121. Catherine Terzian
122. Mark Thibodeau (1977–1978)
123. Peter Towse (? – 1978)
124. Behrooz Vasseghi (? – 1978)
125. Samuel Veal (1976–1978)
126. Ali Aschar Vil
127. Bethan Wiliams (1977–1978)
128. Trevor Wood
129. Wendy Woodbridge (1977–1978)
130. Jennifer (Jenny) Wyatt (1974–1979)
131. Nazila Zand-Karimi
132. Vazgen Zarokian
133. Pejman Parhami (1975–1977)

== Disbanding of the company ==
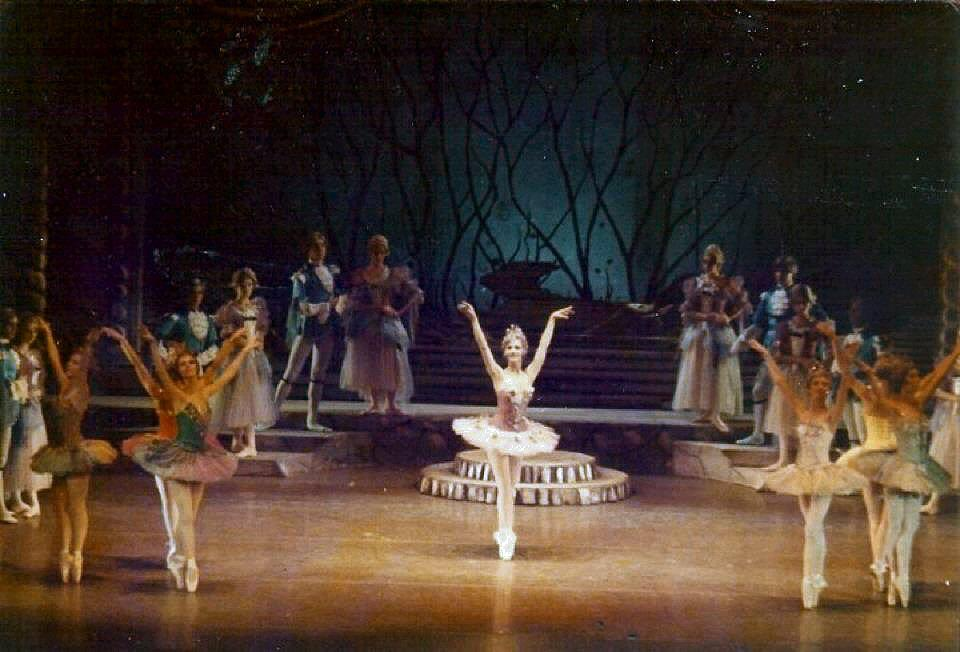
Iranian National Ballet Company's production of Sleeping Beauty, 1978

The civil unrest and political upheavals that caused the collapse of the monarchy and establishment of a theocracy in Iran started in 1978 and was escalating rapidly. The last ballet production that was staged at the Roudaki Hall Opera was Sleeping Beauty during the fall season of 1978. By December 1978 and January 1979, the political situation of the country became increasingly unstable. Almost all foreign members of the company left Iran during this period as soon as there was a flight available, before the complete collapse of the regime in February 1979. Employed dancers were informed that there were dismissed till the new government's further notice. Eventually, a meeting was arranged in Bāgh-e Manzariyeh in northern Tehran soon after the victorious revolution in the presence of Roudaki Hall's workforce and Ayatollah Mohammad Mofatteh. When he was asked about the fate of ballet in Iran, he replied irately and in no uncertain terms that Islamic Republic and ballet is paradoxical and self-contradictory. The Iranian National Ballet Company was thereafter formally declared as dissolved in 1979.

== Revival of the Iranian National Ballet Company in Les Ballets Persans ==
Twenty-three years after disbanding of the Iranian National Ballet, the Swedish-Iranian dancer and choreographer Nima Kiann created a new company in Stockholm, Sweden, with the support of the Swedish authorities. Inspired by Les Ballets Russes and Ballets suédois as exiled dance companies representing vastly the culture of their countries, he named the company Les Ballets Persans (Persian: سازمان باله ایران). The company repertory is entirely based on the Persian culture and heritage and does not include any works of the Western repertoire unless they are created based on Persian heritage. The project of revival of the Iranian National Ballet Company made an international impact and was regarded as the most extensive individual artistic project ever realized outside of Iran.

== Notes ==
- On the 35th anniversary of disbanding of the company, on August 29, 2014, around forty former members of the Iranian National Ballet, including Nejad and Haideh Ahmadzadeh and Ali Pourfarrokh, gathered together in Washington DC to celebrate and share the accomplishments of the company. This was the first reunion of company members after leaving Tehran thirty-five years ago. In a message sent to this reunion, Nima Kiann the founder of Les Ballets Persans, the successor company of the Iranian National Ballet, wrote: ...On behalf of the new generation of Iranian ballet artists, I salute all attending and even absent members of the company this evening. Your collective accomplishment of the past time is today’s fundament on which this new generation is standing on. It is a reason of pride for the new and future generations of Iranians and a reminder of a passed time of development and progress for the art form of dance in Iran.

== See also ==
- Vahdat Hall
- Les Ballets Persans
- Official website of Nima Kiann
