= Babek (ballet) =

Babek (Azerbaijani: Babək) is a heroic Spartacus-like ballet in two acts, based on the story of the people’s liberation struggle against Abbasid Caliphate under the leadership of Babak Khorramdin. Akshin Alizadeh composed the music and the prominent Azeri choreographers of the Soviet era Rafiga Akhundova and Maksud Mamedov choreographed the ballet for Azerbaijan State Academic Opera and Ballet Theater (National Ballet of Azerbaijan) in 1986.

== Story ==
The ballet creation narrates the story of the brave Iranian national hero, Babak Khorramdin, who in the 9th century led the rebellion against foreign occupying forces and local feudal lords in Iran. Babak succeeded Javidan, a rebel who had led the resistance during many years. On his deathbed, Javidan declares Babak as his successor and the one who would lead the resistance against the foreign occupation. For more than twenty-two years, Babak bravely fought the Arab invaders from his remote castle in the mountains of northwestern Iran and inflicted heavy casualties on the army of the Abbasid Caliphate. Finally he was betrayed by Afshin and captured by the army of the Caliph. Babak was brutally executed but his legend lives until today.

== World premiere ==
Created for the National Ballet of Azerbaijan, the ballet was staged in Baku at V.I. Lenin Palace (now Heydar Aliyev Palace) on 20 May 1986. The principal role of the ballet was performed by Vitaliy Akhundov, winner of the Grand Soviet Ballet Contest. Four performances were staged at the V.I. Lenin Palace and later the ballet was included in the repertoire of the national ballet at Azerbaijan State Academic Opera and Ballet Theater.

== Presentation in the West ==
A series of performances followed the world premiere in Baku during 1986. After a successful season during the same year, the ballet fell into oblivion and was never re-staged in Azerbaijan. Nima Kiann, the founder and artistic director of Les Ballets Persans discovered the forgotten ballet and invited the choreographers to revive the ballet in order to be included in the world premiere production of the newly established Les Ballets Persans in Sweden. Thus, Babek was introduced for the first time in the West and for a European audience sixteen years after its world premiere in Baku. Staging of Babek in Stockholm was also the first presentation of the art form of Azerbaijanian ballet outside the country after the fall of the Soviet Union.

== Legacy ==
The expressing and colorful music of Babek is one of Azerbaijan's musical compositions best representing the genre of historical and epic music. The composer, Akshin Alizadeh, has mentioned Babek as the composition he was born and living for to create:

"Babek" is my whole life. I applied much effort into this ballet. When I was working on this ballet, I felt myself like a gladiator. I wrote this composition during the course of 10 years.
