= Elizabeth Hesselblad =

Swedish religious foundress (1870–1957)

Saint Elizabeth Hesselblad OSsS
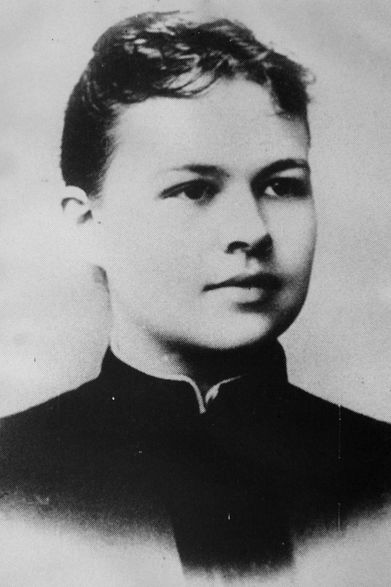
- Elizabeth Hesselblad

Virgin
- Born: 4 June 1870; Fåglavik, Västra Götaland County, Sweden
- Died: 24 April 1957 (aged 86); Rome, Italy
- Venerated in: Catholic Church; Church of Sweden
- Beatified: 9 April 2000, Saint Peter's Square by Pope John Paul II
- Canonized: 5 June 2016, Saint Peter's Square by Pope Francis
- Feast: 4 June

Maria Elizabeth Hesselblad, OSsS (4 June 1870 – 24 April 1957), was a Swedish Catholic religious sister who founded a new, active branch of the Bridgettines known as the Bridgettine Sisters. She is recognised as a Righteous Among the Nations due to her efforts to save Jews during the Holocaust. Pope John Paul II beatified her on 9 April 2000 and Pope Francis canonised her 5 June 2016 at Saint Peter's Square.

== Life ==
=== Early life and conversion ===
Maria Elizabeth Hesselblad born on 4 June 1870 as the fifth of thirteen children born to August Robert Hesselblad and Cajsa Petersdotter Dag – Lutheran parents from Fåglavik in Västra Götaland County. She was baptized the following month and received into the Lutheran Church of Sweden in her parish of Hudene.

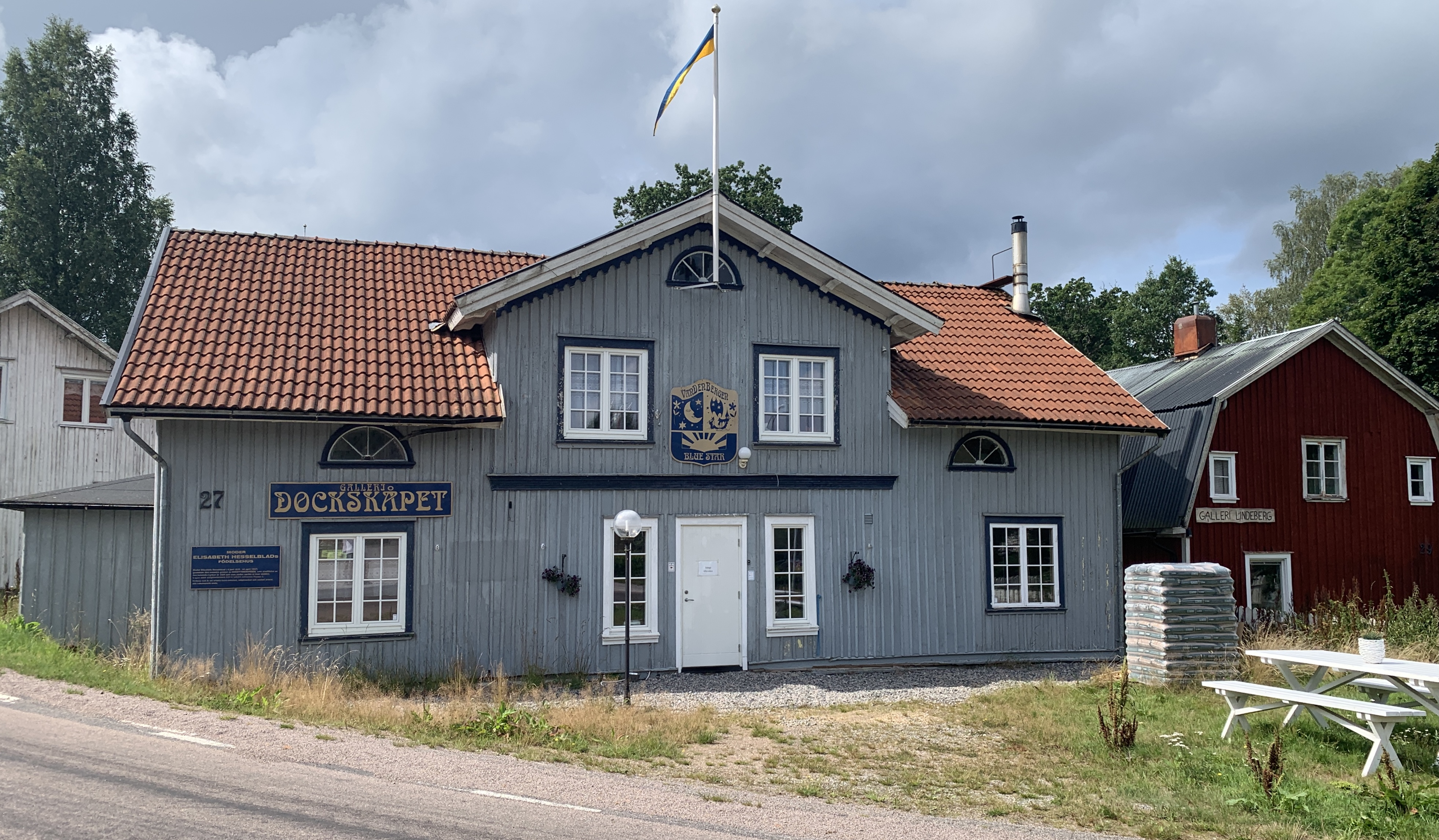
The birth house of Elisabeth Hesselblad

By 1886, she had to work to help them make ends meet. At first, she looked for work in Sweden, but eventually immigrated to the United States in 1888, where she studied nursing at Roosevelt Hospital in New York City. While there, she did home nursing, which brought her into contact with the Catholic faith of many of the poor for whom she cared. In 1896, Elizabeth decided to leave hospital work for private duty nursing. She became a nurse and companion to two teenage daughters of wealthy Catholics, the Cisneros family.

She developed an interest in the Catholic Church while deep prayer and personal study led her down the path of conversion and on 15 August 1902, the Feast of the Assumption, she received conditional baptism from a Jesuit priest, Johann Georg Hagen, in the chapel of the Georgetown Visitation Monastery in Washington, D.C. Hagen also became her spiritual director. As Elisabeth Hasselblad reflected on that moment, she wrote: "In an instant the love of God was poured over me. I understood that I could respond to that love only through sacrifice and a love prepared to suffer for His glory and for the Church. Without hesitation I offered Him my life, and my will to follow Him on the Way of the Cross". Two days later, she received her First Communion and would depart for Europe.

Hesselblad approached Hagen and asked that she be received into the Church at once, to which Hagen said he did not think she was prepared. However, after questioning her at length and after significant consideration, he saw no reason not to receive her into the Church. It was in that same year that her brother, Thur, also converted to Catholicism.

=== Religious experiences ===
Hesselblad then made a pilgrimage to Rome, where she received the sacrament of Confirmation. She also visited the house of Bridget of Sweden there, where Bridget had spent the last half of her life, which made a deep impression on her. At that point, Hasselblad felt called to dedicate her life to the work of Christian unity. She returned to New York City briefly, only to go back to Rome, where, on 25 March 1904, she was welcomed as a guest by the nuns of the Carmelite monastery housed there; the prioress welcomed her after hesitating to accept her due to her weak health. However, she allowed Hasselblad on the condition of a period of probation. Yet it was at this point she fell gravely ill and even had to receive the Extreme Unction. She slowly recovered and held out against her family's pleas to return to Sweden.

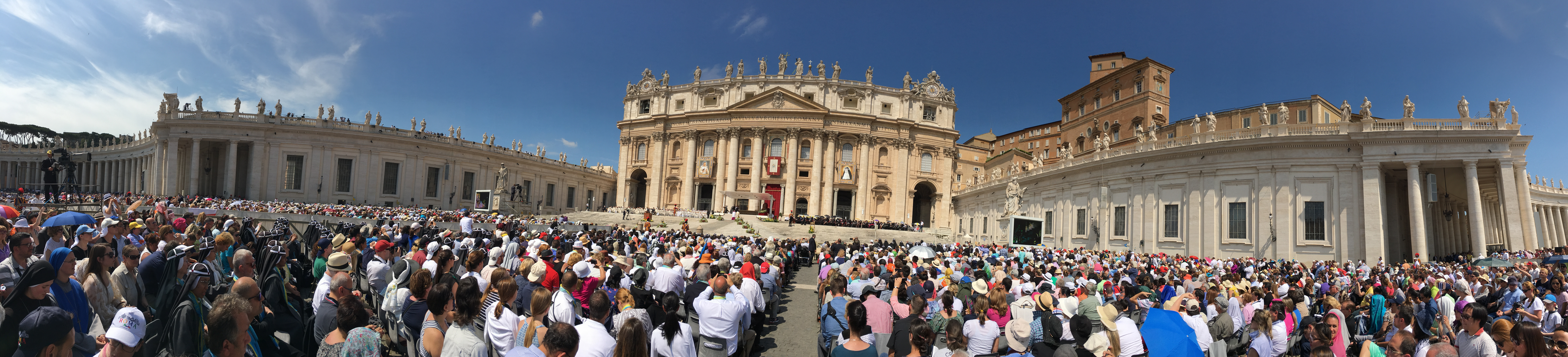
Canonization Mass on 5 June 2016

She petitioned the Holy See to be able to make religious vows under the Rule of the Order which Bridget had founded. She had been a prominent presence in the Church in Sweden before the Protestant Reformation had taken hold there. Hasselblad received special permission for this from Pope Pius X in 1906, at which time she assumed the habit of the Bridgettines, including its distinctive element of a veil with a symbolic crown. She professed into the hands of Hagen on 22 June 1906, the Feast of the Sacred Heart.

Hesselblad attempted to revive interest in the order and its founder in both Sweden and Rome. Her proposal to establish a monastery of the order on the site where Bridget had lived received no volunteers from the few monasteries of the order still in existence. Giving up on the intention of following the established way of life in the order, she proposed one which included the care of the sick. To this end she was joined by three young women from England, whom she received on 9 November 1911, with which the new congregation was established. Their particular mission was to pray and work, especially for the conversion of the Scandinavian people to the Catholic Church.

Hesselblad returned to her homeland of Sweden in 1923, where she was able to establish a community in Djursholm, while she worked nursing the sick poor. The new congregation was established in England in 1931 after receiving the approval of the Holy See. That same year, Hesselblad obtained the House of Saint Bridget in Rome for her new congregation. A foundation was made in India in 1937 which drew many new members. Her order received canonical approval on 7 July 1940.

Hesselblad became known as "the second Bridget". During World War II – and after – she performed many charitable works on behalf of the poor and those who suffered due to racial laws and also promoted a peace movement that involved Christians and non-Christians. The war also saw her save the lives of over sixty Jews from the Holocaust.

Her apostolic zeal contributed to the conversion of the Baptist minister Piero Chuminelli – author of a biographical account of Bridget of Sweden – and she also had close ties to the former Chief Rabbi of Rome Israel Zolli (Eugenio) who converted to the faith in 1946.

=== Death ===
Hesselblad's health declined when officials prepared the canonical visit of her order. On 23 April 1957 she gave her blessing to the sisters and held her raised hands in a solemn gesture in which she murmured: "Go to Heaven with hands full of love and virtues". She received the sacraments thereafter and died in Rome on 24 April 1957 (Easter Wednesday) in the first hours of the morning.

== Sainthood ==
=== Process and beatification ===
The sainthood process commenced in Rome in 1987 and concluded its work in 1990. Pope John Paul II proclaimed Elisabeth Hasselblad to be a Venerable Servant of God on 26 March 1999 after he recognised that she had lived a model Christian life of heroic virtue. The miracle requested for her beatification was investigated in 1996 and received ratification in Rome on 17 October 1998.

=== Canonization ===
Pope Francis approved the second miracle attributed to her on 14 December 2015 which would allow for her future canonization; the date was decided at an ordinary consistory of cardinals on 15 March 2016 and was celebrated in Saint Peter's Square on 5 June 2016.

The miracle was investigated in the diocese of its origin in Cuba in February 2014 – the miracle in question occurred in the late 2000s – and was validated in Rome on 20 June 2014. A medical board approved the miracle in April 2015.

== Distinctions ==
- Israel: Righteous Among the Nations by Yad Vashem (2004), due to her work in assisting Jews during World War II
- Sovereign Military Order of Malta: Order pro merito Melitensi

== See also ==
- Rescue of Jews by Catholics during the Holocaust

== Literature ==
- Agneta af Jochnick Östborn: For Sweden, I have given God my life! Elisabeth Hesselblads calling and Birgittine mission in Sweden, Artos, Skellefteå 1999.
- Called to Holiness: Blessed Elizabeth Hasselblad, Catholica, Vejbystrand 2000.
- Lars Cavallin: "Mother Mary Elisabeth Hesselblad OSsS from Fåglavik – pioneer of modern monastic life in Sweden" in Johnny Hagberg (editor): Monasteries and Monastic Life in the Medieval Diocese of Skara, Skara County Historical Society 2007.
- Marguerite Tjäder: Mutter Elisabeth – Die neue Blüte des Ordens saints Birgitta . EOS-Verlag, Sankt Ottilien 2002, ISBN 3-8306-7116-4.
- J. Berdonces, Hesselblad, Maria Elisabeth, in Dictionary of the institutes of perfection, vol. IV, Pauline Editions, Milan, 1977, coll. From 1530 to 1531.
