= Anne Heaton (ballet dancer) =

British ballerina (1930–2020)

Anne Heaton (19 November 1930 – 1 May 2020) was a British ballet dancer and teacher.

Anne Heaton was born in Rawalpindi in November 1930. She studied in Birmingham from 1937 to 1943, and then with Sadler's Wells Ballet School. She made her debut in 1945 with Sadler's Wells Opera. In 1946 she joined Sadler's Wells Theatre Ballet creating roles in Howard's Mardi Gras (1947) and Ashton's Valses nobles et sentimentales (1947) among others.

In 1948, she moved to Sadler's Wells Ballet at Covent Garden where she became a principal. She excelled in romantic ballets like Les Sylphides in 1948, A Mirror for Witches (1952) and Giselle in 1954, but also created roles in MacMillan's The Burrow (1958) and The Invitation (1960). She resigned in 1959 due to an injury to her foot, although she made occasional guest appearances until 1962.

After retirement, she taught at the Arts Educational School and also staged some ballets, including Giselle for Iranian National Ballet in 1971. In 1958 she married Royal Ballet principal dancer John Field, who later became director of La Scala in Milan. She was later co-director (with her husband) of the British Ballet Organisation (now known as bbodance) from 1984 until a month before his death in 1991.

Heaton died in May 2020 at the age of 89.
