= Zohreh Jooya =

Zohreh Jooya زهره جویا
- Birth name: Zohreh Jooya
- Born: Mashhad, Iran
- Occupation: Singer
- Labels: ARC Music, Koch International Records, Taraneh records
- Website: www.zohreh-jooya.org

Zohreh Jooya (Persian: زهره جویا) is a singer from Mashhad, Iran.

== Music career ==
Jooya's father was an Afghan (from Herat, Afghanistan) and her mother was an Iranian and they married at a time when it was criminal for an Afghan man to marry an Iranian woman. Zohreh Jooya has been said to have moved to Europe for further advancement into music studies. After earning her classical music education from Amsterdam, she then moved to Vienna in 1980, where she later earned a master's degree in opera at the Conservatoire of the City of Vienna. Both the Oriental, middle eastern and the European worlds influence Jooya. She has created a new way of interpreting the traditional music of Persia, played on original instruments, and presented on several albums. Koch International has produced Persian Nights and Taraneh Music has made Journey to Persia. Her albums exemplify the beauty of the diverse ethnic music in Iran. Her works with Majid Derakhshani comprise poetry Shamsudin Mohammad Hafez, and Shafii Katkani played on Oriental and European instruments. Published by ARC Music "Music of the Persian Mystics"She also sings mystical songs from the ancient poet Nezami in "Shirin and Farhad", "The Indian Princess" and "Shahresad" with Parviz Mamnun, Professor of Persian literature.

== International approach ==
Jooya's music builds bridges between the cultures of Iran, Afghanistan, and the Western world. Her European classical engagements have been, not only in diverse opera performances throughout many European countries but also in the performance of the songs of Mozart, Beethoven and Schubert on television and radio shows. Currently, she performs at concerts throughout Europe covering a broad spectrum and from Italian baroque music to songs of George Gershwin.

Her newest album the only non-Iranian album Music from Afghanistan covers traditional folklore songs from Afghanistan. On this album, she performs with the well-known singer Hamid Golestani, a Hazara from Afghanistan. The album was arranged by the masters Sobeir Bachtiar and Majid Derakhshani.

== Albums ==
- Persian Nights: Traditional Folk Music from Iran (1995), Koch International
- Journey To Persia (1998), Koch International
- Music of the Persian Mystics (2003), Arc
- Afghan Music (2010), Arc – with Ustad Hossein Arman
- Ensemble Afghan
- Essence Of Love
