= Magsud Mammadov (dancer) =

Azerbaijani ballet dancer (1929–2026)

- Maqsud Məmmədov
- Born: Magsud Davud oghlu Mammadov; 30 May 1929; Ganja, Azerbaijan SSR, Transcaucasian SFSR, Soviet Union
- Died: 13 April 2026 (aged 96)
- Education: The Bolshoi Ballet Academy
- Occupations: Ballet dancer; ballet master; pedagogue
- Spouse: Rafiga Akhundova
- Awards

Magsud Davud oghlu Mammadov (Azerbaijani: Maqsud Davud oğlu Məmmədov; 30 May 1929 – 13 April 2026) was a Soviet and Azerbaijani ballet dancer and ballet master. He was honoured as a People's Artiste of the Azerbaijan SSR in 1970.

== Life and career ==
Mammadov was born on 30 May 1929 in Ganja. In 1950, he graduated from The Bolshoi Theatre Ballet School (Nikolay Tarasov's class). After returning to Baku, he worked as a soloist at the Azerbaijan State Opera and Ballet Theater beginning in 1951.

He performed complex parts both in Azerbaijani ballets and world classics with great success. The basis of the artist's creativity is the performance of the characters of Polad ("Maiden Tower", Afrasiyab Badalbeyli), Manzar, Lenny ("Seven Beauties" and "The Path of Thunder", Gara Garayev), Farhad ("Love legend", Arif Malikov), Azad ("Gulshan", Soltan Hajibeyov), Parviz ("Gypsy girl", Ashraf Abbasov), Albert ("Giselle", Adolphe Adam), Desiree, Siegfried, Shahzade ("The Sleeping Beauty", "Swan Lake" and "The Nutcracker" Pyotr Ilyich Tchaikovsky), Li-Chan-Fou and Ma Lichen ("The Red Poppy", Reinhold Glière), Piero ("The Golden Key", Boris Zeidman), Kolen ("Harlequinade", Riccardo Drigo), Vatslav ("The Fountain of Bakhchisarai", Boris Asafyev), Frondoso ("Laurencia", Alexander Krein), Hero ("Chopiniana", Frédéric Chopin), Basil ("Don Quixote", Ludwig Minkus).

The role of Farhad in Arif Malikov's "Love legend" ballet is one of Magsud Mammadov's most successful works. He won the tour of Azerbaijan Opera and Ballet Theater in Monte Carlo, France and Luxembourg.

From 1972 to 1973, he worked as a ballet master and pedagogue in Algeria.

Mammadov was a member of the CPSU from 1979. He was the husband of People's Artist Rafiga Akhundova.

Mammadov died on 13 April 2026, at the age of 96.

== Awards and honors ==
- Honored Artist of the Azerbaijan SSR (1955)
- Order of the Red Banner of Labour (1959)
- People's Artiste of the Azerbaijan SSR (1970)
- Shohrat Order (2019)
