= Fåglavik =

- Location within Västra Götaland Location within Sweden
- Coordinates: 58°07′N 13°06′E
- Country: Sweden
- Province: Västergötland
- County: Västra Götaland County
- Municipality: Herrljunga Municipality and Vara Municipality

Area
  - Total: 0.57 km^{2} (0.22 sq mi)

Population (2005-12-31)
  - Total: 209
  - Density: 364/km^{2} (940/sq mi)
- Time zone: UTC+1 (CET)
  - Summer (DST): UTC+2 (CEST)

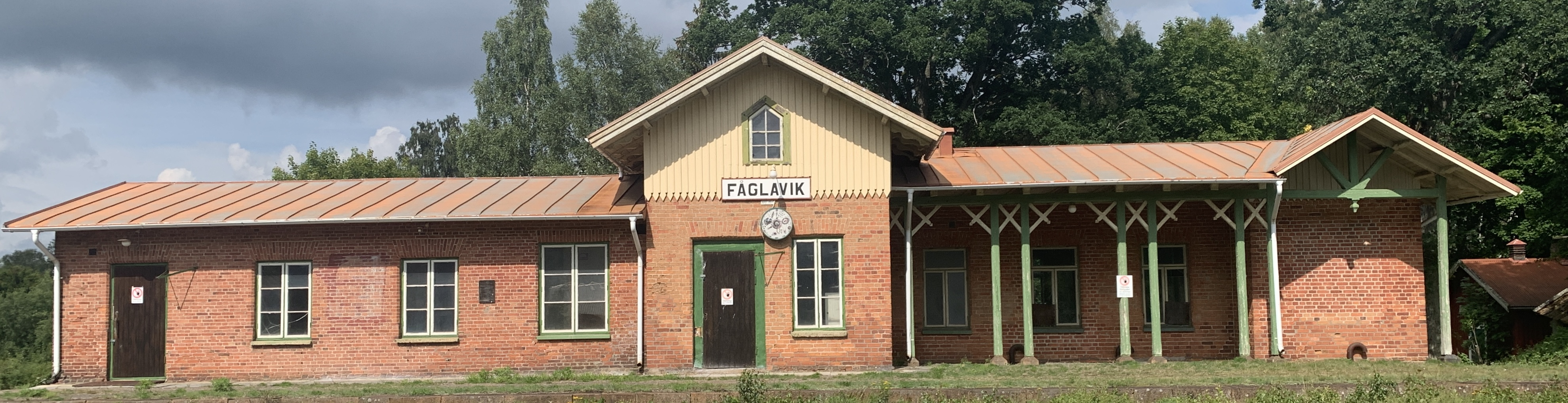
Fåglaviks station house - 2021

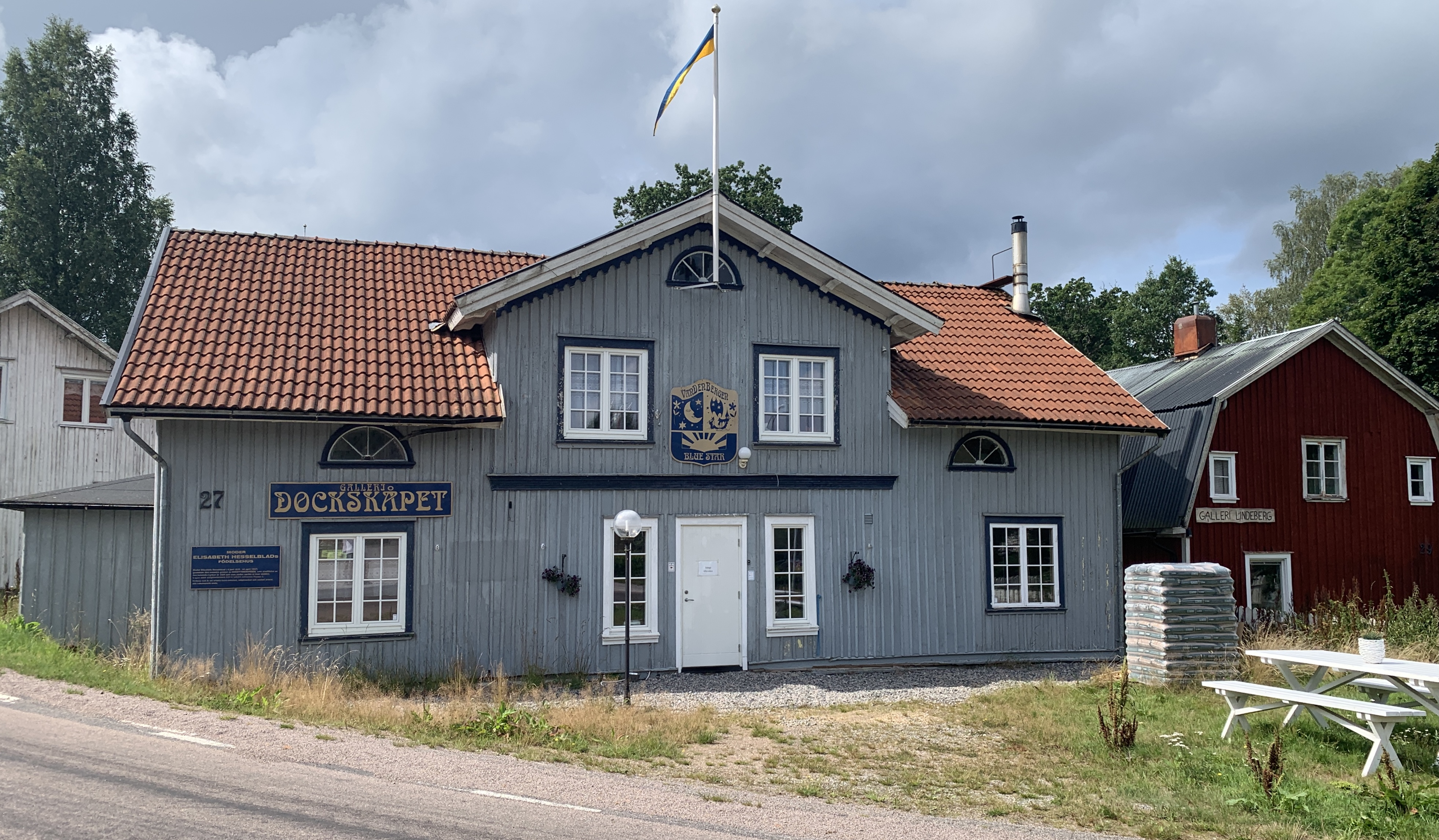
The birth house of Elisabeth Hesselblad

Fåglavik is a bimunicipal village situated in Herrljunga Municipality and Vara Municipality in Västra Götaland County, Sweden. It had 140 inhabitants in 2020.

Fåglavik is the birthplace of the Saint Mary Elisabeth Hesselblad (June 4, 1870 – April 24, 1957): nurse, Catholic nun and re-founder of the Bridgettines. Artist Jan van den Bergen used to live in the house where she was born. Van den Bergen, who was known for painting fantasy scenes, died some time after 2008 due to cancer.

The village used to have a glass factory; a brick building which was contaminated with asbestos. During 2008, the building was demolished and site conditioned to reduce the spread of contamination into the environment.
