= Agshin Alizadeh =

Azerbaijani composer (1937–2014)

Agshin Aligulu Alizade
- Born: 22 May 1937; Baku, Azerbaijan
- Died: 3 May 2014 (aged 76); Baku, Azerbaijan
- Occupation: Composer
- Known for: Babek (1986)

Agshin Aligulu Alizade (Azerbaijani: Aqşin Əliqulu oğlu Əlizadə; 22 May 1937 in Baku – 3 May 2014 in Baku) was a Soviet and Azerbaijani composer, People's Artist of the Azerbaijani SSR (1987).

Alizade made a significant contribution to the development of the Azerbaijani ballet. He was the creator of the first Azerbaijan heroic epic ballet "Babak", established in 1979 on the poem by Ilya Selvinsky (premiered in 1986). The next ballet "Journey to the Caucasus", which reflected the events of the history of Azerbaijan and the image of the poet Khurshidbanu Natavan and the French writer Alexandre Dumas, embodied the vital problems of modern history, as if expressing the principle of "the past in the present." The same trend projections of past events in modern life emerged in the last one-act ballet, "Waltz of Hope."

Alizade headed the Union of Composers of Azerbaijan, and was the Secretary of the Union of Soviet Composers. He was also awarded People's Artist of Azerbaijan SSR, laureate of State Prize (1978)

== Honorary names and prizes ==
- Sharaf Order — 21 May 2012
- Shohrat Order — 22 May 1997
- People's Artiste of the Azerbaijan SSR — 30 January 1987

== Works ==
Ballets

- Babek (1979)
- Travel to Caucasus (2002)
- Hope Waltz (2008)

Compositions for symphonic orchestra

- Symphony No. 1
- Symphony No. 2: Chamber Symphony
- Symphony No. 3
- Symphony No. 4: Alla Mugham (Muğamvari)
- Symphony No. 5
- Concerto for violin and orchestra
- Poem for cello and orchestra

Compositions for chamber orchestra

- Child suite
- Village suite
- Pastoral
- Alla Ashig (Aşıqsayağı)
- Warlike (Cəngi)
- "Portrait" for violin and fortepiano
- "Dialog" for violin and organ
- "Old Games" for fortepiano
- "Epic Story" for fortepiano

Choral Symphonies

- Cantata Azərilər (Azeris)
- Cantata Təntənə (Celebration)
- Ode Ana Torpaq (Motherland)
- A cappella Bayatılar
- A cappella Qədim Laylay (Ancient Lullaby)
- Yumoreska for children's choir
