= Robert de Warren =

British former ballet dancer and choreographer

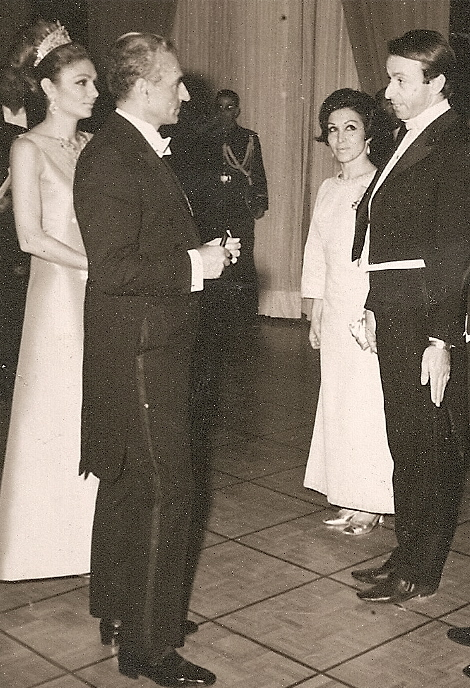
Robert de Warren (right) being presented to the Emperor and Empress of Iran (left) in 1967.

Robert de Warren (born 1933) is a British former ballet dancer, choreographer. He was the foundering director of the National Folklore Society of Iran (1971–1976). He was the artistic director of Northern Ballet in England for 11 years, and Sarasota Ballet of Florida for 13 years.

== Biography ==
Robert de Warren was born in 1933 in Montevideo, Uruguay to British parents, and his early years were spent in Montevideo and Argentina. His early dance training was in Uruguay, where he met his wife, Jacqueline, a French ballerina. de Warren studied at Sadler's Wells School (now the Royal Ballet School) in London, before joining National Ballet of Uruguay in 1954. He also danced ballet with the Covent Garden Opera Ballet (1958–1960), Stuttgart Ballet (1960–1962), and Frankfurt Ballet (1962–1964).

=== Iran ===
De Warren was recommended by Ninette de Valois to become the Ballet Master and Choreographer to the National Ballet of Iran, where he worked from 1965–1970.

At that time the Minister of Culture asked de Warren to found the National Folklore Society of Iran, which he directed until 1978 - with Empress Farah Pahlavi as a patron. The performing dance company for the National Folklore Society of Iran was the Mahalli Dancers of Iran (also known as the Mahalli Folk Dance Troupe), which toured the world. The school, Iranian National and Folkloric Dance Academy, was associated with training the dancers, which he led. One of his students at the school was noted dancer Farzaneh Kaboli.

=== Europe ===
De Warren joined the Northern Ballet in England in 1976, after the resignation of Laverne Meyer. He was the director of Northern Ballet from 1976 to 1987, and under his leadership he made fundamental changes to the company to emphasize classical ballet, and Rudolf Nureyev was made a regular guest artist.

De Warren was director of the Ballet at Teatro alla Scala Milan, from 1987 to 1994 on recommendation of Rudolf Nureyev.

=== United States ===
De Warren joined the Sarasota Ballet as artistic director in 1994, succeeding Eddy Toussaint. He remained at the Sarasota Ballet for 13 years, leaving in 2007 with his role was filled by Ian Webb.

De Warren founded the Sarasota International Dance Festival. The proclamation of "Robert de Warren Day" on February 18, 2016 was made by the Vice Mayor of Sarasota, Suzanne Atwell, announcing this recognition of de Warren's 22 year contribution to the cultural life of Sarasota and beyond. The County Council also recognized Robert de Warren. His broad dedication to develop all performing arts was recognized through his many theatrical presentations in creating a repertoire that included the Sarasota Opera, the Sarasota Symphony, Sarasota Circus, the Ringling Museum of Art, to name but a few.
