= Lia Schubert =

Lia Schubert (1926–2016) was a dancer, choreographer and instructor who was born into a Jewish family in Vienna. To escape anti-Semitism, the family moved first to Zagreb and in 1938 to Paris where she studied ballet. After narrowly escaping Nazi persecution during World War II, she moved to Malmö, Sweden, in 1950 and to Stockholm in 1953. In 1957, she founded the Ballet Academy at Stockholm University. She moved to Israel in 1968 where together with Caj Lottman she founded the Institute for Dance in Haifa. In the 1980s, she moved back to Sweden where she initiated the Dansteater Thalia in Gothenburg. Suffering from poor health, she retired in 1997 and died two years later at her home in Fåglavik.

== Early life ==
Born in Vienna, Austria, on 28 June 1926, Lia Schubert was the daughter of the textile retailer Dezider Schubert and his wife Adolfine née Fein. She had a brother, Walter, born in 1923. Threatened by anti-Semitism, the family moved to Zagreb, Yugoslavia, in 1930 where from the age of ten Schubert trained in ballet under Margaretha Forman and performed at the Zagreb Opera when she was 12. In 1938, the family moved to Paris where she studied under such prominent instructors as Olga Preobrajenska, Victor Gsovsky and Nora Kiss.

During the German occupation of France, her father, mother and brother were all captured and murdered by the Nazis, but thanks mainly to her young age Lia managed to survive. In 1944, she nevertheless narrowly escaped from a Gestapo search of the Marseille Opera where she was working. Thanks to the Jewish Resistance, she spend the remainder of the occupation in Paris where her former trainer Gsovsky helped her to escape detection.

== Career ==
After the war, Schubert helped to rehabilitate children from the concentration camps. She continued to train as a dancer, performing with the ballet companies of Lille and Marseille. Around 1950, while she was performing at the Théâtre de Paris as a dancer in Franz Lehar's The Merry Widow, she was discovered by Carl-Gustaf Kruuse af Verchou, the ballet master at the Malmö City Theatre. He persuaded her to move to Malmö where she was employed as both an instructor and a dancer.

In 1953, Schubert moved to Stockholm where she established a private ballet school which later became the Ballet Academy. While teaching there, she performed at the city's Oscarsteatern where she met and married the actor Sten Lonnert. She went on to introduce the latest European and American trends to Sweden, collaborating with Stockholm University to offer a course in both classical and modern dance. Thanks to the instructors she brought in mainly from the United States, the Ballet Academy accepted its first batch of student in 1957.

In 1960, she met Steffi Nossen who invited her to New York City to lecture and make contacts with dance teachers. Schubert was successful in persuading the instructor Walter Nicks to join the Ballet Academy and introduce jazz dance to Sweden. This proved enormously successful, leading Nicks to present a TV series in 1966. Supported by the cultural authorities, Schubert was able to open her Dansteater. With music by Georg Riedel, the first show was Jazzballet-61.

Upset that her effort to create the Cullberg Ballet were not recognized, in 1968 she moved to Israel where she taught at various dance schools. In 1969, together with Kaj Lutman, she established the Haifa Dance Center School and the dance troupe Bimat Harakdanim. Based on the school's success, they received support from the Ministry of Culture to create the ballet school Haifa Ballet Piccolo. As a result, Haifa became an importance centre for dance in Israel.

After spending 11 years in Israel, in view of the political developments Schubert decided to return to Sweden. After teaching for a few years with the Opera's ballet in Stockholm, she moved to Gothenburg to run the Ballet Academy she had created in 1967. In 1983, she created the first formal training programme for musical artists there. Thanks to her enthusiasm, the Gothenburg Ballet Academy became an important training centre for artists from Sweden and beyond.

== Death ==
As a result of poor health, Lia Schubert left the Gothenburg Ballet Academy in 1997. She died on 16 December 1999 at her home in Fåglavik.
