= Rafiga Akhundova =

Soviet ballet dancer (1931–2024)

- Rəfiqə Axundova
- Born: 7 August 1931; Baku, Azerbaijan SSR, Transcaucasian SFSR, USSR
- Died: 6 February 2024 (aged 92); Baku, Azerbaijan
- Occupations: Ballet dancer, ballet master
- Spouse: Magsud Mammadov
- Awards

Rafiga Haji gizi Akhundova (Azerbaijani: Rəfiqə Hacı qızı Axundova, Russian: Рафига Ахундова; 7 August 1931 – 6 February 2024) was an Azerbaijani ballet dancer, ballet master and People's Artiste of the Azerbaijan SSR (1970).

== Biography ==
Rafiga Akhundova graduated from Baku Choreography School in 1951 and completed an advanced course at the Bolshoi Theatre (1951–1952, Moscow). From 1951 to 1971, she was a soloist of the Azerbaijan Opera and Ballet Theater. Beginning in 1971, she was the ballet master of that theater, and from 1990, she was the chief ballet master. Together with her husband, Magsud Mammadov, she staged the ballets "Caspian ballad" (1968, T. Bakikhanov), "Shadows of Gobustan" (1969, F. Garayev), "Yalli" and "Azerbaijan Suite" (1969, R. Hajiyev), "The Path of Thunder" and "Seven Beauties" (1975, 1978, G. Garayev), "Babek" (1986, A. Alizadeh), "The Nutcracker" (1988, P. Tchaikovsky) at the Azerbaijan Opera and Ballet Theater, as well as "The Path of Thunder" (1976, G. Garayev) at the Novosibirsk Opera and Ballet Theater. She worked as a teacher-ballet master in Algeria, Sweden, Egypt and Belgium. "Caspian Ballad", "Shadows of Gobustan" and "Azerbaijani Suite" were presented at the 7th International Dance Festival held in Paris in 1969 and were awarded the diploma of the Paris Dance Academy. In 1994, she staged the ballet "Seven Beauties" in Saint Petersburg (together with Magsud Mammadov).

On 26 April 1958 she received the honorary title of "Honored Artist of the Azerbaijan SSR" and, on 21 May 1970, the honorary title of "People's Artiste of the Azerbaijan SSR". On 9 June 1959, she was awarded the Order of the Badge of Honour, and on 6 August 2021 the Shohrat Order.

Rafiga Akhundova was the wife of ballet master Magsud Mammadov. She died on 6 February 2024, at the age of 92.

== Sources ==
- Cabir, S. "Gənc istedadlar" [Müəllim-aktrisa, "Qızmar günəş altında" kino-filmində Gülpəri rolunu oynayan Sürəyya Qasımova və Opera və Balet Teatrının gənc balet artisti Rəfiqə Axundova haqqında] //Ədəbiyyat və incəsənət.- 1957.- 28 dekabr.
- Şəhriyar Cəfərov: "Bu ölkədə vətənpərvərlik yad janra çevrilib"
