= Visramiani =

Medieval Georgian version of Persian romance Vis and Ramin

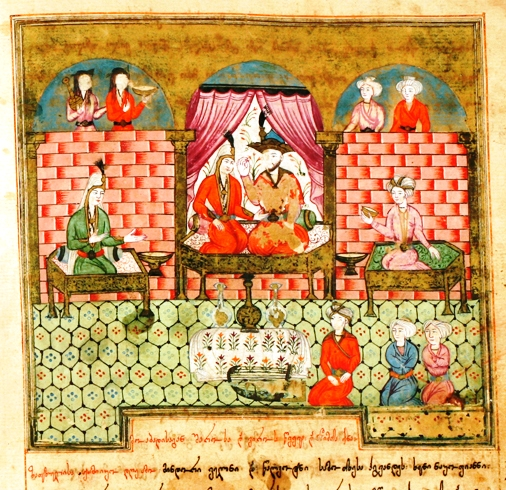
A Persianate miniature from the 1729 manuscript of Visramiani. National Center of Manuscripts MSS S3702.

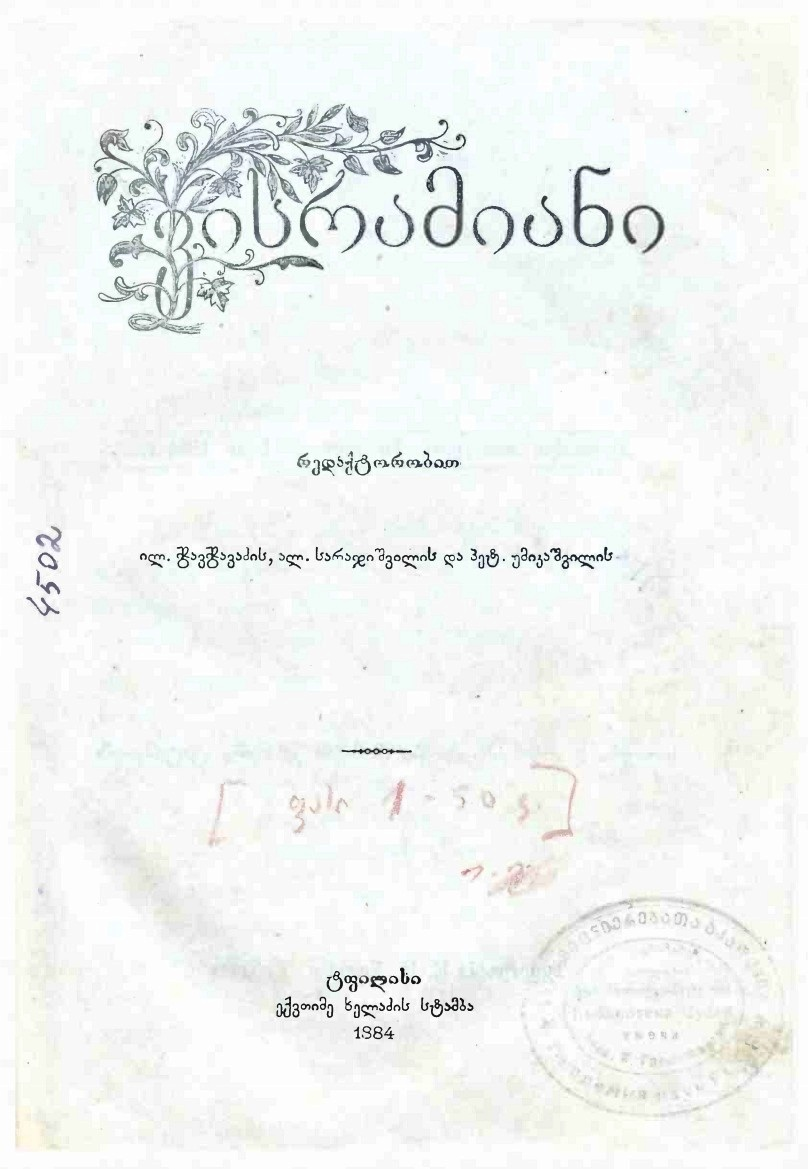
The first-ever printed edition of Visramiani. Tbilisi, 1884.

Visramiani (Georgian: ვისრამიანი) is a medieval Georgian version of the old Iranian love story Vīs and Rāmīn, traditionally taken to have been rendered in prose by Sargis of Tmogvi, a 12th/13th-century statesman and writer active during the reign of Queen Tamar (r. 1184–1213).

The Georgian version is a free prose translation which fully retains the spirit of the Persian original but differs from it in a number of minor details, at the same time rendering the translation a vivid national coloring. Visramiani proved to be a considerable influence on all further development of Georgian literature. The story is mentioned and admired virtually in all classical pieces of medieval and early modern Georgian literature, including in the poem by Shota Rustaveli which is a crowning merit of the medieval Georgian poetry. Notably, Vis and Ramin feature among 12 most famous pairs listed by Queen Tamar's official chronicle The Histories and Eulogies of Sovereigns on the occasion of her marriage to the Alan prince David Soslan.

The importance of Visramiani for the history of the Persian text lies in that, being the oldest known manuscript of the work and better preserved than the original, it helps restore corrupted lines and determine the reliable editions in different Persian manuscripts a bulk of which date to a later period (17th–18th centuries).

Visramiani was first published by the writer Ilia Chavchavadze in 1884 and first introduced to the English-speaking world through the translation by Sir Oliver Wardrop as Visramiani: the story of the loves of Vis and Ramin, a romance of ancient Persia in 1914. It was later extensively studied and compared with the Persian text by the Georgian Iranologists Alexander Gvakharia and Magali Todua in the 1960s.

== See also ==
- Amiran-Darejaniani, a 12th-century Georgian chivalric romance
- The Knight in the Panther's Skin, a 12th-century Georgian epic poem
- Georgia-Persia relations
