= Majid Derakhshani =

Iranian musician and composer

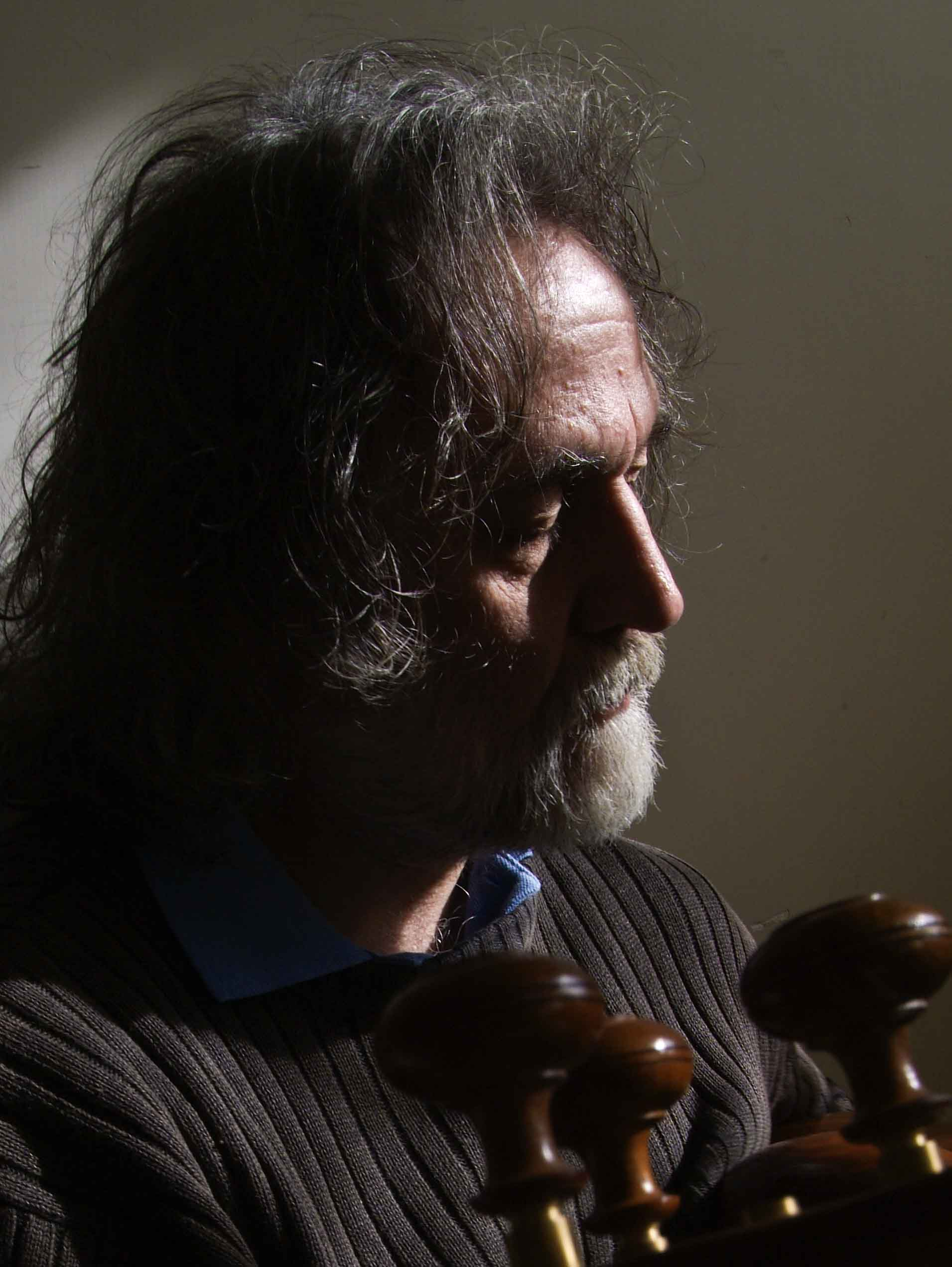
Majid Derakhshani, 2006

Majid Derakhshani (Persian: مجید درخشانی) (born 13 September 1957 in Sangesar, Imperial State of Iran) is an Iranian musician and composer.

He was born into a family of artists from the Iranian province Semnan, Sangesar.

Subsequent to his emigration to Germany he founded the Nawa Musikzentrum in Cologne; the primary and most active center for Persian classical music outside of Iran.

He has published Many Albums cooperation with the best artists such as Mohammadreza Shajarian, Homayoun Shajarian, ....

Also many Concerts in around the world.
