= Bayat-e Esfahan =

Bayat-e Esfahan (Persian: بیات اصفهان) is one of melodic pieces of Iranian traditional music, known as a branch of Dastgah-e Shur or Dastgah-e Homayun. Some musical theorists consider the Bayat-e Esfahan an independent dastgah within the Persian radif system.

== Features ==
Ruhollah Khaleqi has noted that this mode conveys the emotional capacity of both happiness and sadness.

== Branches ==
Bayat-e Esfahan has a number of branches or gushehs, including:

- Daramad-e avvval (first preface)
- Daramad-e dovvom (second preface)
- Jame daran
- Bayat-e Raje
- Oshagh (owj)
- Bayat-e Shiraz
- Suz va Godaz
- Naghme
- Masnavi
- Sufi name (or Saki name)
