= Mohammad-Reza Shajarian discography =

Mohammad Reza Shajarian discography
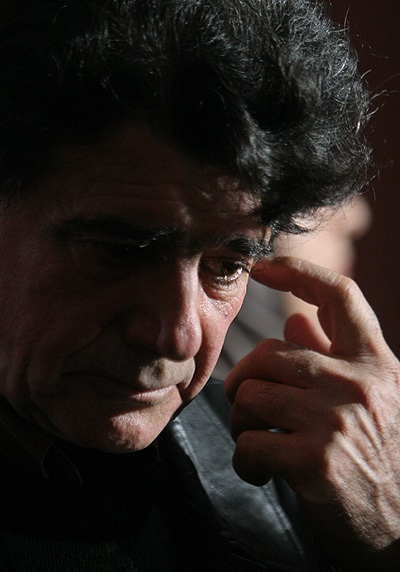
- Studio albums: 60

Mohammad-Reza Shajarian (23 September 1940 – 8 October 2020) was an Iranian singer, musician, composer and calligrapher.

== Albums ==
=== Studio albums ===
List of studio albums
Title	Year	Album details	Ref
Robaeiat-e Khayyam	1972		

- Robaeiat-e Khayyam (1972)
- Chavosh 1 (Be Yad-e Aref) (1977)
- Golbang-e Shajarian (1978)
- Chavosh 2 (1978)
- Sepideh (Chavosh 6)]] (1979)
- Chavosh 7 (1979)
- Jan Jan (album) (Chavosh 9)]] (1979)
- Raz-e Del (1979)
- Entezar-e Del (1979)
- Peyvand-e Mehr (1984)
- Astan-e Janan (1985)
- Bidad (1985)
- Serr-e Eshgh (Mahoor) (1986)
- Nava, Morakabkhani (1986)
- Dastan (album) (1988)
- Saz-e Ghese Goo (1988)
- Dood-e Ood (1989)
- Del-e Majnoon (1990–1991)
- Khalvatgozideh (1991)
- Payam-e Nasim (1991)
- Sarv Chaman (1991)
- Asman-e Eshgh (1991)
- Delshodegan (1992)
- Yad-e Ayyam (1992)
- Cheshmeye Noosh (1993)
- Deylaman (album) (1994)
- Bahariyeh (album) (1994)
- Gonbad-e Mina (1994)
- Jan-e Oshagh (1995)
- Peygham-e Ahl-e Del (Homayoun Masnavi) (1995)
- Dar Khial (1996)
- Rosvaye Del (1996)
- Eshgh Danad (1997)
- Shab-e Vasl (1997)
- Moamaye Hasti (1997)
- Chehreh Be Chehreh (1998)
- Shab, Sokout, Kavir (1998)
- Aram-e Jan (1998)
- Ahang-e Vafa (1999)
- Booye Baran (1999)
- Zemestan Ast (2001)
- Bi To Besar Nemishavad (2002)
- Faryad (2002)
- Hamnava Ba Bam (2003)
- Jam-e Tohi (2004)
- Saz-e Khamoosh (2007)
- Sorood-e Mehr (2007)
- Ghoghaye Eshghbazan (2007)
- Konsert-e Mohammad-Reza Shajarian Va Gorooh-e Ava (2008)
- Konsert-e Mohammad-Reza Shajarian Va Gorooh-e Shahnaz (Randan-e Mast Va Morgh-e Khoshkhan) (2008)
- Ah Baran (2009)
- Zaban-e Atash (2009)
- Randan-e Mast (2009)
- Konsert-e Mohammad-Reza Shajarian Va Gorooh-e Shahnaz Dar Dubai (2010)
- Morgh-e Khoshkhan (2011)
- Ranghaye Taali (2013)
- Tarigh-e Eshgh (2016)
- Khorasaniat (2019)

=== Live ===
- Iran: Dastgah chahargah

=== Soundtrack ===
- Delshodegan

=== Single ===
- 2019 Bote Man / Nargese Jadoo
- 2019 Delroba
- 2019 Gholame Cheshm
- 2019 Nedaye Eshgh
- 2020 Dream
- 2020 Autumn
- 2020 Broken Heart
- 2020 Hich
- 2020 Khorasaniat
- 2020 YashT
