= Bidad =

Studio album by MohammadReza Shajarian
- Released: 1985
- Recorded: 1984
- Genre: Persian traditional music, classical music
- Length: 1:13:37
- Language: Persian
- Label: Sheida Music Group, Aref Ensemble
- Producer: Mohammad Reza Shajarian

MohammadReza Shajarian chronology
Astan-e Janan (1985)	Bidad (1985)	Serr-e Eshgh (1986)

Bidad (Persian: بیداد) is an album featuring collaborative works by Parviz Meshkatian and Mohammad Reza Shajarian, released in 1985. The album consists of two parts: the first part is composed by Parviz Meshkatian in the Homayoun musical mode, while the second part features pieces in Homayoun and Shoor, performed by Qolamhossein Bigjekhani. Both parts are sung by Mohammad Reza Shajarian.

The lyrics of the album are derived from the works of the Persian poets Hafez and Saadi.

== Track listing ==
Standard edition
No.	Title	Writer(s)	composed by	Length
1.	"Pish Daramad-e Homayoon"	Hafez	Parviz Meshkatian	5
2.	"Edameyeh-ye Saz o Avaz"
3.	"Ghete-ye Sozo Godaz"
4.	"Introduction"
5.	"Chaharmezrab-e Oshagh"
6.	"Saz Va Avaz"
7.	"Tasnif-e Halak-e Man"
8.	"Tasnif-e Yad Bad"
9.	"Chaharmezrab-e Homayoun"
10.	"Chahar Mezrab-e Bidad"
Total length:				1:13:37
