= Dastgāh-e Māhur =

Dastgah-e Mahur (Persian: دستگاه ماهور, romanized: Dastgāh-e Māhūr) is one of the seven Dastgāhs of Persian traditional music. Classically, Persian music is organized into seven Dastgāhs and five Āvāzes, however from a merely technical point of view, one can consider them as an ensemble of 12 Dastgāhs.

== Introduction ==
The intervallic structure of the mode of Māhur partly parallels that of the major mode in western classic music. Yet, because of the other elements which go into the making of Persian modes, probably no melody in the major mode can be said to be in the mode of Māhur. A far closer analogue from an intervallic standpoint is the Obikhod scale (widespread in Russian medieval Znamenny chant and folk song) and the Jewish Adonai malakh mode. The modal structure of Māhur is shown below for Māhur C :

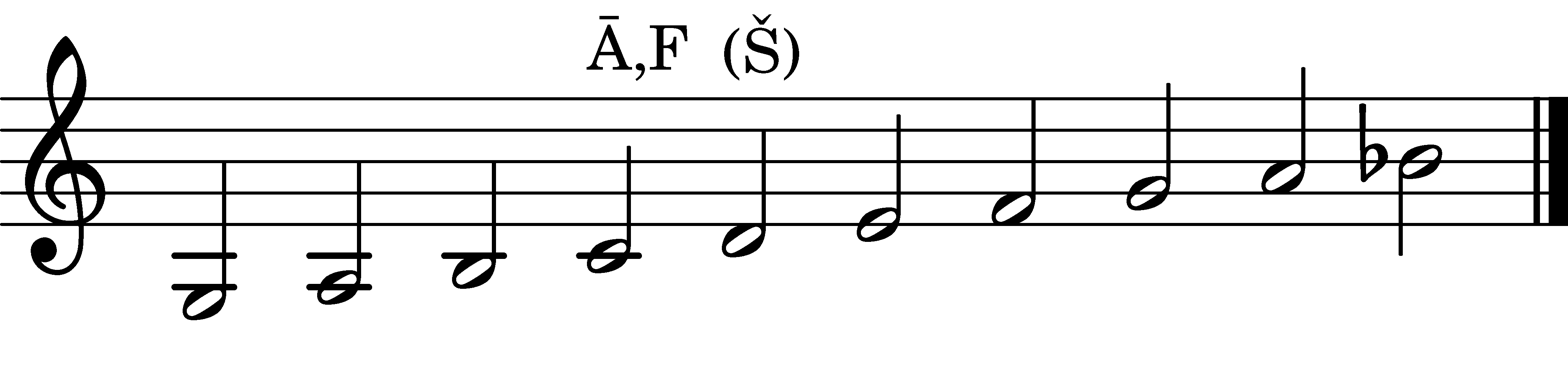

The characteristics of this mode are:

1. The range is unusually wide, a minor 10th.
2. The finalis (marked "Ā,F") has a central position; it is the linking tone of two conjunct major tetrachords. It is also the usual Āqāz.
3. The 7th above the finalis is a semi-tone flatter than its lower octave, the 2nd below.
4. Leaps of thirds both ascending and descending are common.
5. Ascending leaps of perfect fourths are occasionally used. A leap of perfect fifth from the finalis to the 5th above is rarely used. The use of such leaps makes Māhur capable of greater excitement than most other Persian modes. But, the melodic movement is still predominantly step-wise.

== Forud ==
In Dastgāh-e Māhur, because of its many diverse Gušes, the role of the Forud is very significant in binding the whole repertoire together. In the Forud, the 3rd and the 2nd below receive emphasis, and usually the finalis is approached from below. The following score is a typical Forud of Māhur, transcribed here in Māhur C :

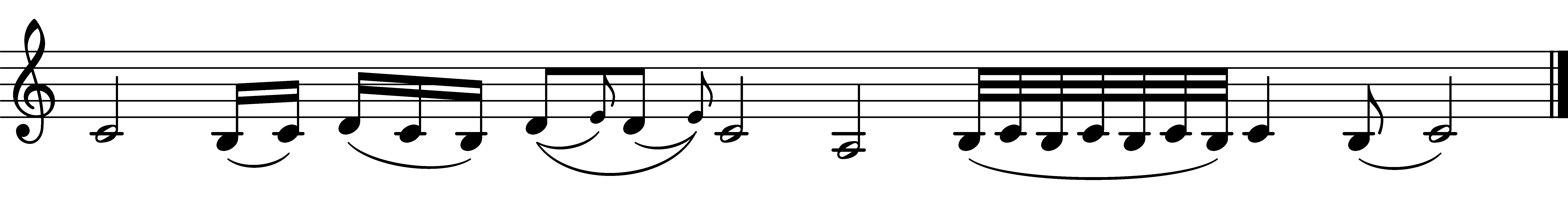

The finalis may be approached from above. This type, as shown in the next score, is less typical and gives no emphasis to the tetrachord below the finalis:

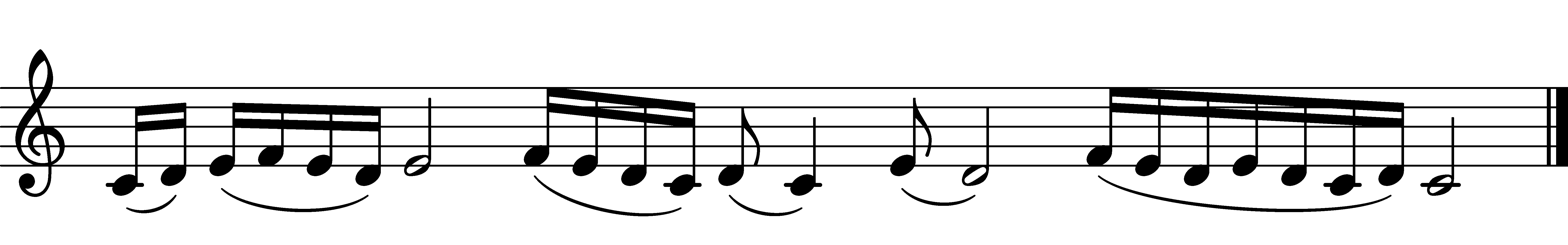

A third type of Forud, given in the following score emphasis the four notes above and below the finalis:

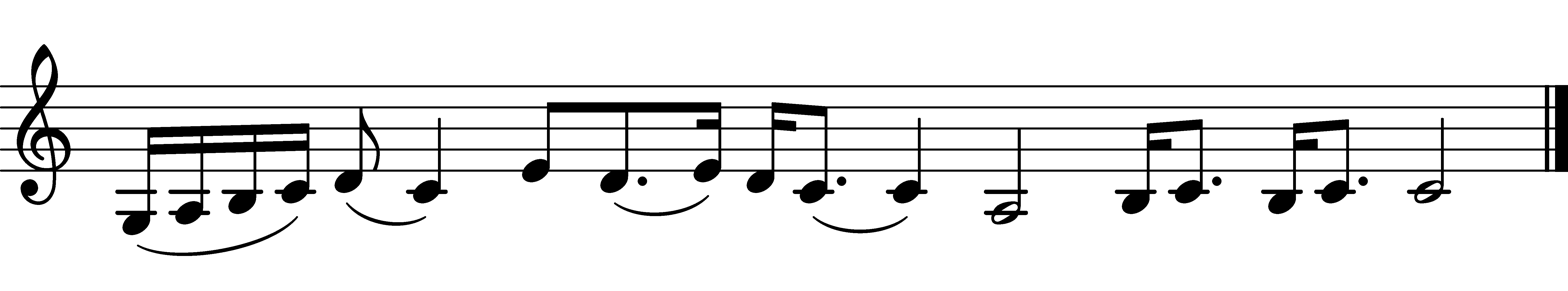

== Darāmad ==
An authentic style of performance in Dastgāh-e Māhur customarily begins with an improvisation under the name of Moqaddame (meaning introduction in Persian) before the Darāmads. This Moqaddame is sometimes followed by a group of metric pieces, which are of recent origins and not of sufficient interest or authenticity to be considered here. The Moqaddame itself is nearly always included in a performance. It is a stately but unornate declamation which sets the tone for the Dastgāh, even though its characteristics are not maintained throughout. The Moqaddame places more emphasis on the tetrachord below the finalis; its basic melodic pattern is given here in Māhur C :

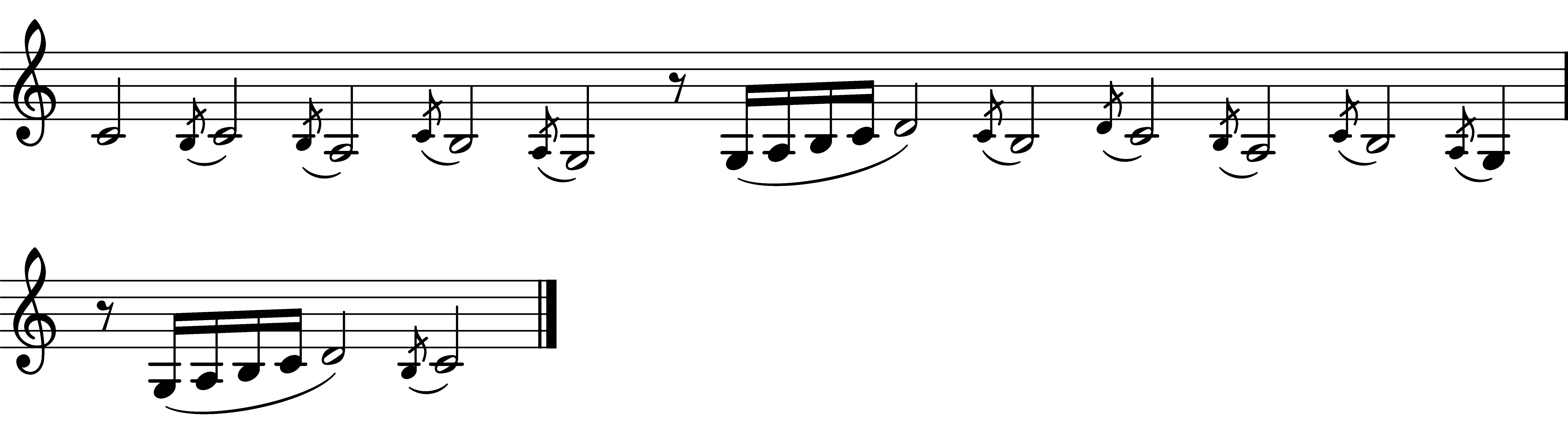

After the Moqaddame, the Darāmad section begins. Here, certain modifications in the mode of Māhur are effected. These modifications are:

1. The tetrachord above the finalis receives more emphasis than the tetrachord below it, except in the Forud.
2. The 2nd above the finalis (d in our scale) becomes the Šāhed.
3. The 4th above may function as the Āqāz in place of the finalis.
4. The melodic movement is overwhelmingly diatonic. Rare leaps of thirds are used; larger leaps are avoided, unless between phrases.

The basic formula for a Darāmad in Māhur C is given in the following score:

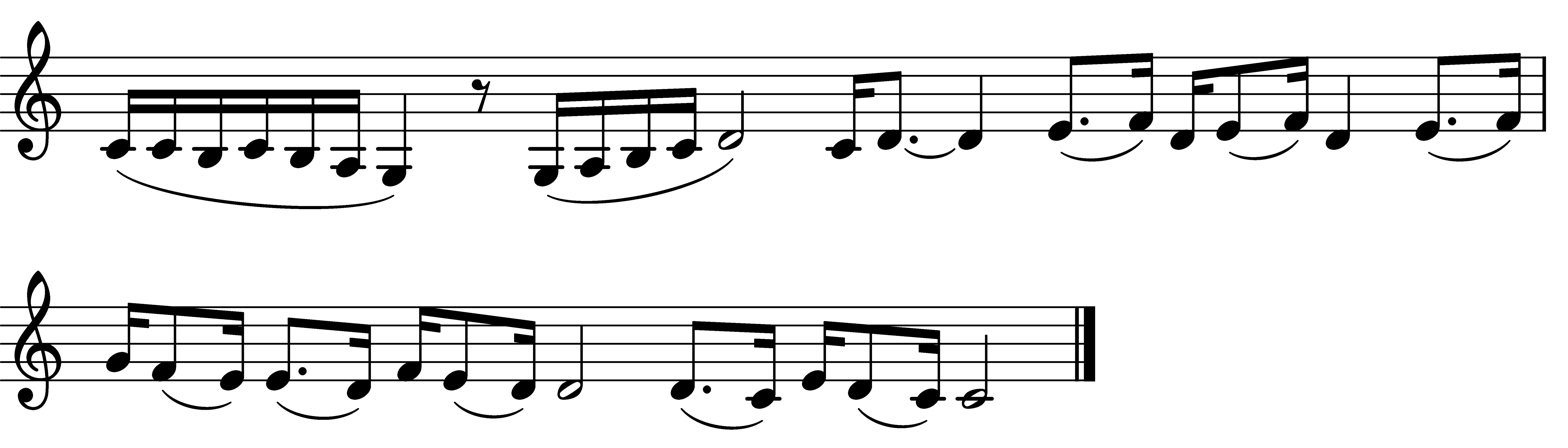

Dāstgah-e Māhur is rich in the number and variety of its Gušes, many of which modulate to modes very remote from the mode of Māhur itself. The major Gušes are Dād, Xosrovāni, Tusi, Azarbāyejāni, Feyli, Abol, Delkaš, Neyriz, Šekaste, Nahib, Arāq, Āšur, Rāk, Rāk-e Kašmir, and Rāk-e Hendi.

== See also ==
- Dastgāh-e Šur
