= Astan-e Janan =

Studio album by MohammadReza Shajarian
- Released: 1985
- Genre: Persian traditional music, classical music
- Length: 1:15
- Language: Persian
- Producer: Del Avaz

MohammadReza Shajarian chronology
Peyvand-e Mehr (1984)	Astan-e Janan (1985)	bidad (1985)

Astan-e Janan (Persian: آستان جانان) is an album of Persian traditional music composed by Bayat Zand and sung by Bayat e Kurd with the voice of Mohammad Reza Shajarian, which was performed at the Italian Embassy in Tehran^{ex} in 1983 and released in 1985. The album was composed by Parviz Meshkatian. The lyrics of this album are composed by Hafez and Baba Tahir.

== Track listing ==
Standard edition
No.	Title	composed by	Length
1.	"Sar Andaz (Pish Daramad)"	(Naser Farhangfar ناصر فرهنگ‌فر)	6:34
2.	"Astane Janan (Santoor Solo 1) (Bayat Tork)"		1:08
3.	"Sarve Naz (Chahar Mezrab)"	Naser Farhangfar	2:31
4.	"Astane Janan (Sazo Avaz 1)"		15:07
5.	"Astane Janan (Sazo Avaz 2)"		4:21
6.	"Astane Janan (Tasnif)"		6:01
7.	"Astane Janan (Santoor Solo 2)"		1:56
8.	"Astane Janan (Santoor Solo 3)"		2:06
9.	"Astane Janan (Sazo Avaz 3)"		11:18
10.	"Astane Janan (Sazo Avaz 4)"		18:56
11.	"Sheydaei (Tasnif)"		5:00
Total length:			1:15:00
