= Afshari =

Afshari or Afshar may refer to:

- Afshari (Persian music), is a branches of Dastgah-e Shur in Persian classical music.
- Afshari (surname), an Iranian and American surname.
- Afshar people, Turkic tribe in Turkey and Afghanistan.
  - Afshar dialect, Turkic dialect spoken by Afshar tribe of Iran and Afghanistan.
- Moasseseh-ye Afshari, is a village in Bavi County, Khuzestan Province, Iran.
