= Dastgah-e Shour =

Shour (Persian: دستگاه شور, romanized: Dastgāh-e Šur) is one of the seven Dastgahs of Persian Music.

Classically, Persian Music is organized into seven Dastgāhs and five Āvāzes. However, from a merely technical point of view, one can consider them as an ensemble of 12 Dastgāhs.

== Introduction ==
Šur is in some respects the most important of the Dastgāhs. It contains a large body of pieces, and in its domain belong four important Āvāzes: Dašti, Abuatā, Bayāt-e Tork and Afšāri. A great many folk tunes, from different parts of Persia, are founded on the modal schemes of Šur or its derivative Dastgāhs and Gušes.

The melodic formation in Šur is conceived within the modal structure shown below for Šur D :

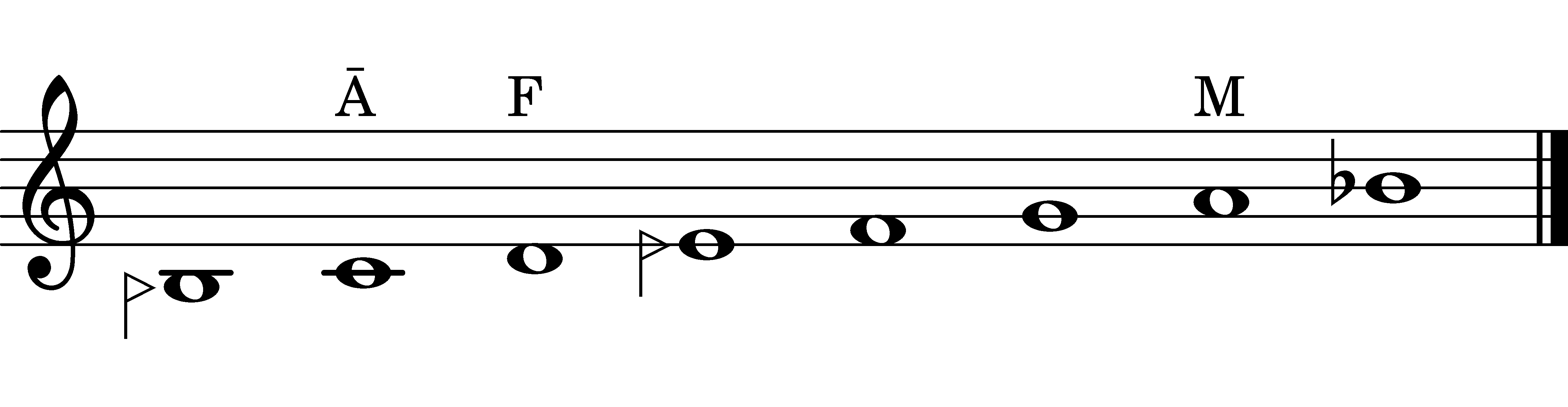

=== Characteristics ===
The characteristics of this mode are:

1. The tetrachord above the finalis (marked with "F") is the focal point of melodic activity.
2. The finalis is the most emphasized tone.
3. The 4th above is the minimal high point in the mode, and has considerable prominence.
4. The 2nd and particularly the 3rd above the finalis are also heard frequently.
5. The 5th above (marked with "M") is a Moteqayyer (meaning variable in Persian). When the melodic line is descending, it is usually lowered by a micro tone from A to A (A koron). This lowering is responsible for the creation of a sense of finalis for the 4th above, since by lowering the A^{♮} to A, the original tetrachord is recreated from G.
6. The 6th above has no significant role except as a note of resolution for the 5th when used ascendingly (a^{♮}). The 7th above can be, and frequently is, entirely omitted.
7. The 2nd below (marked with "Ā") has considerable importance both as a frequent note of Āqāz (meaning beginning in Persian) and in cadences, where one of the most common cadential patterns involves a progression from the 2nd below to the finalis.
8. The 3rd below is also used frequently in cadences. In such situations it is used ascendingly, resolving to the 2nd below and then to the finalis. Here, the 3rd below is higher than its octave (6th above) by a micro tone, B instead of B^{♭}.

== Forud ==
In every Dastgāh the Forud assumes a very significant role as a unifying agent which binds together the various Gušes in that Dastgāh. In most Dastgāhs, more than one Forud pattern is used.

In a Šur Forud, the finalis may be approached by way of:

1. the 2nd below,
2. the 3rd and 2nd below,
3. the 2nd above, or
4. the 4th above.

What precedes these approaches can be brief or extensive depending on the extent of Forud improvisation. The following scores, give an average length for each of these Forud types in Šur D:

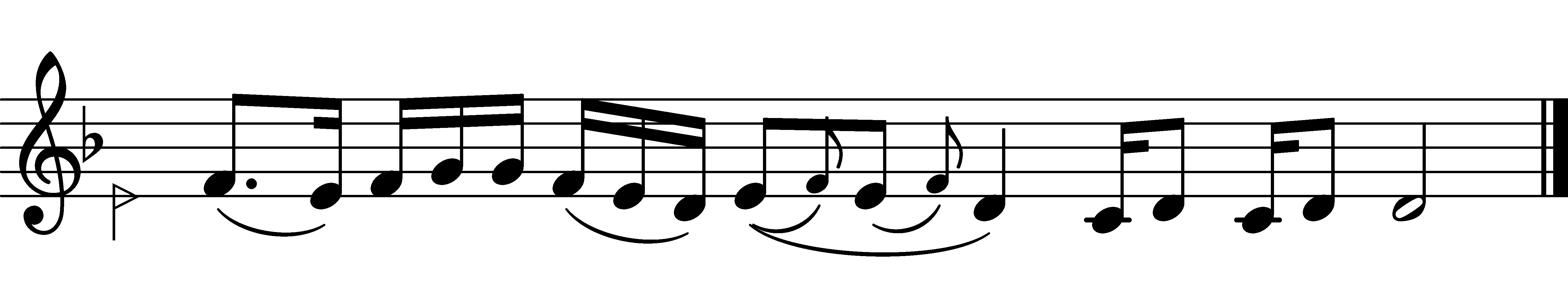
(a)

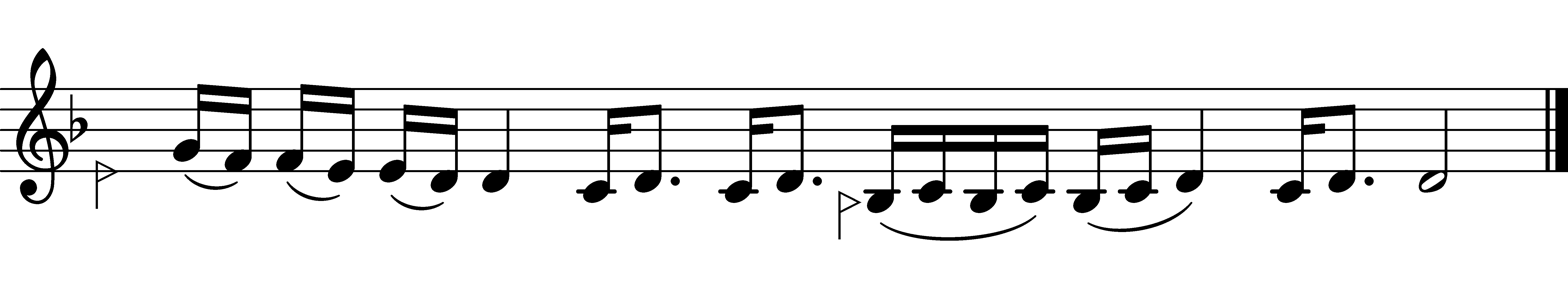
(b)

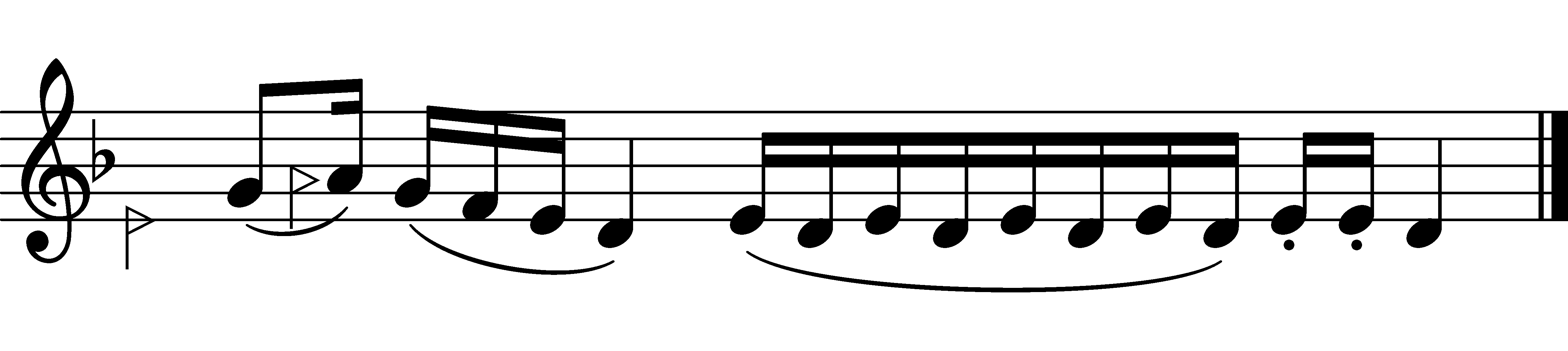
(c)

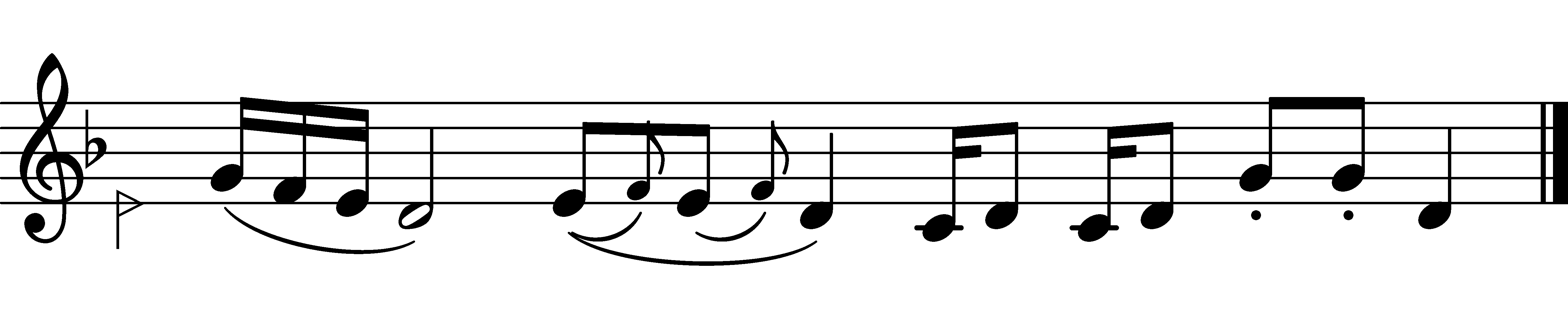
(d)

== Darāmad ==
The melodic movement of Šur, as of all Dastgāhs and Gušes, is overwhelmingly diatonic. No leaps larger than a perfect 4th are made. Most leaps of 4ths actually occur between the end of one phrase and the beginning of another. In other situations, an upward leap of a 4th is relatively common, from the 2nd below to the 3rd above the finalis, at the beginning of a phrase. An upward and then downward leap of a 4th is common in the Forud d as shown above. This type of ending is also used in a number of other Dastgāhs (e.g. Homāyun and Navā). The very final portion of this Forud, which involves the leap of a 4th down, is known as Bāl-e Kabutar (meaning pigeon's wing in Persian) (see the score below).

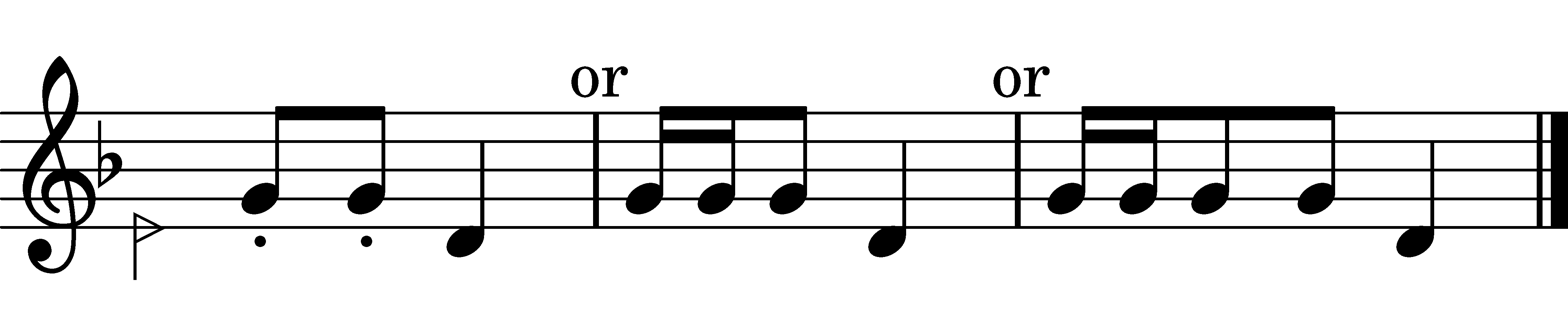

Leaps of 3rds between the notes of the main tetrachord are used sparingly, generally in sequential and ornamental passages, as shown in the following score in Šur D :

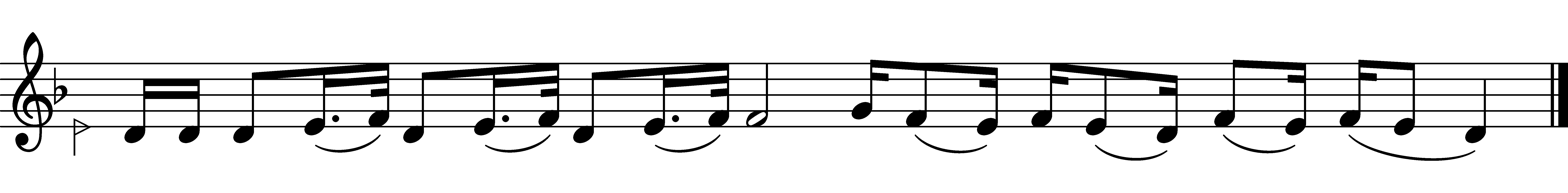

To illustrate the melodic character of Šur, as represented by the Darāmad, two different formulae for Darāmads of Šur are transcribed in the following scores in Šur D :

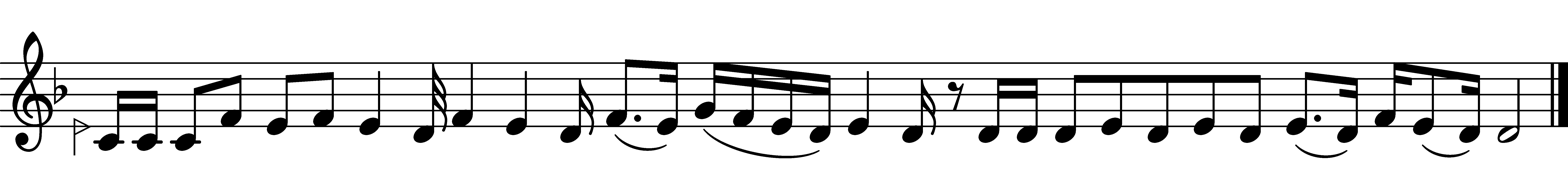
(a)

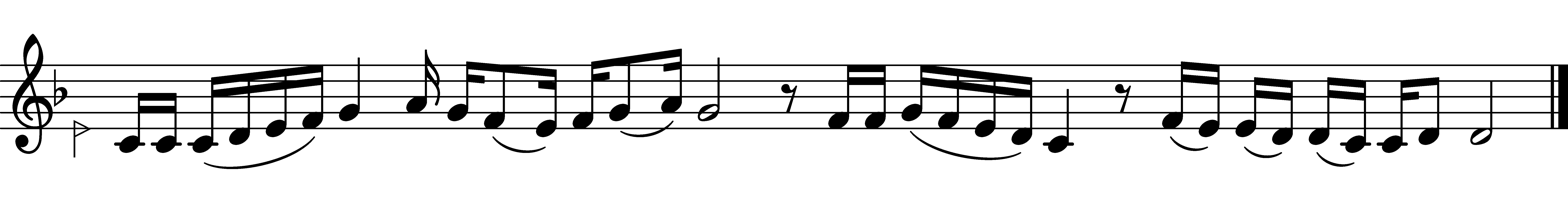
(b)

These formulae, as the basis for improvisation, have been arrived at after analysis of numerous improvisations in Dastgāh-e Šur. After the Darāmad section, those Gušes which are part of the organisation of Dastgāh-e Šur are performed. A complete Radif, such as that of Musā Ma'rufi contains much redundancy and several short and insignificant pieces. The present study has been concerned with larger and more singular pieces, most of which would be included in a normal but extended performance of Šur.

The main Gušes of Dastgāh-e Šur are the following: Salmak, Mollā Nāzi, Golriz, Bozorg, Xārā, Qajar, Ozzāl, Šahnāz, Qarače, Hoseyni, Bayāt-e Kord and Gereyli. They may be performed in that order, but the order is by no means fixed. In a given performance of Dastgāh-e Šur some of the Gušes may be left out altogether, and the order of those included may also vary. This observation will hold true in all of the Dastgāhs. The order in which the Gušes are listed and described represents, at best, the most common arrangement of the most noteworthy pieces in each Dastgāh.

== See also ==
- Dastgāh-e Māhur
