= O Maria, Deu maire =

11th-century Marian hymn in Old Occitan

Song
- Language: Old Occitan
- English title: O Mary, mother of God
- Genre: Hymn

O Maria, Deu maire ("O Mary, mother of God") is an Old Occitan song, a hymn to the Virgin Mary, rare in being one of very few Occitan songs from the Saint Martial school (included in a notated liturgical chant collection with Latin tropes and tractus bound at the Abbey of Saint Martial of Limoges) that is a medieval Occitan Marian Christmas versus with extant neumes for all its stanzas (unlike the convention of notatores concerning later chansonniers who only notated the first stanza) and thus, also entirely religious in its content (beyond the local troubadours cult and its context).

== Source ==
Since chansonniers were usually written at least 150 years after the troubadours, the Troper Proser (F-Pn fonds latin ms. 1139) which was compiled at the Abbey Saint-Martial of Limoges in 1245, comes closer, because its oldest parts (ff. 32r-62r with Benedicamus domino tropes, versus and liturgical dramas; ff.63r-118r with a notated lectionary of epistles, a prosulae collection of the sequentiary, and tropes about ordinarium missae like Sanctus, Agnus dei and kyrie) can be dated back to the last years of the eleventh century (1096-1099), when the earliest troubadours made their first compositions. The neumes used in this early source, although developed for liturgical plainchant, do not bother readers with their rhythmic interpretations like the chansonniers of the late thirteenth and fourteenth centuries using forms of musical notation unknown to composers of the troubadours era.

Musicologists have mainly studied the manuscript due to its hidden way of notating early polyphony of the Saint Martial school (the written-out stanzas often provide a second voice which was notated with the second verse of the first stanza, then for the second verse both voices swap the parts), and was called on "Saint-Martial A (StM-A)" or "Saint Martial 1 (SM 1)" as part of a corpus of four manuscripts compiled at the library of Saint Martial. There is no evidence that each piece of the entire collection has been composed at Limoges and when exactly it was composed, but the collecting scribe obviously had a local focus on Aquitaine.

The Occitan song «O Maria Deu maire» as the second Occitan versus can be found on the folios 49r-50r of the troper or better versarium libellus within a collection of Marian versus for Christmas and is thus rubrified as "versus Sanctae Mariae".

== Text and translation ==
The Occitan verses of the first three stanzas:

O maria deu maire
deu t'es e fils e paire
Domna preia per nos
to fil lo glorios
E lo pair' aissamen
preia per tota ien
E c'el no nos socor
tornat nos es a plor

Eua creet serpen
un a[n]gel resplanden
Per so nos en uai gen
deus n'es om ueramen

Car de femna nasquet
deus la femna saluet
E pre quo nasquet hom
que garit en fos hom

— Versus Sanctae Mariae (F-Pn lat. 1139, f.49)
Translation:

O Mary, mother of God,
God is to you the son and the father.
Lady, pray for us
to the glorious son
and also to the father,
pray for all the people.
And if there is no help for us,
it is our turn to cry.

Eve obeyed a serpent,
a resplendent angel,
that we doomed people [see]
God is not really a man.

Since He was born by a woman,
God saved women;
and thus, He was born as man
that might heal from the fount men.

This early example of Occitan poetry is one of the earliest testimonies of the Old Occitan word dompna (deriving from the male form dompnedieu, and translated here by "lady"), here used in the liturgical context of Marian hymnography, and its verses had been translated into English.

The liturgical versus in Old Occitan language O Maria was probably designed to communicate religious ideas and theological concepts to a local audience in a language they could understand. Already Hans Spanke commented about its simple melody that it does not exclude its use as a processional antiphon, but assumed that it was rather used in multiple ways. Rachel Golden Carlson emphasised in the context of Cluniac reforms by the end of the 11th century, a vast local repertory of tropes and sequences had been abandoned in Aquitaine, that versus became a new prominent genre to fill the gap, especially Marian versus "that alternately places Mary and God in the roles of the Creator and the Created".

== Melody ==
Although the neumes had no clef to understand from which note the singer has to start, the approximate vertical position of the Aquitanian neumes allow to understand the interval steps between them. The melodic composition is made in a frame of an octave from one step below the finalis. Thus, the church tone is an authentic one.

Starting on D re, the resulting melos belongs to the Dorian mode which was called "autentus protus" or "tonus primum". The tool to verify the exact church tone of plainchant was the libellus ("little book" as part of a notated liturgical manuscript) called tonary which was very common and widely used in Aquitaine. But this Occitan versus was rather an exception and a tonary libellus of this manuscript has not survived, but the reception of the Limousin troubadour Giraut associated it with another Marian hymn just composed in a very similar Dorian melos.

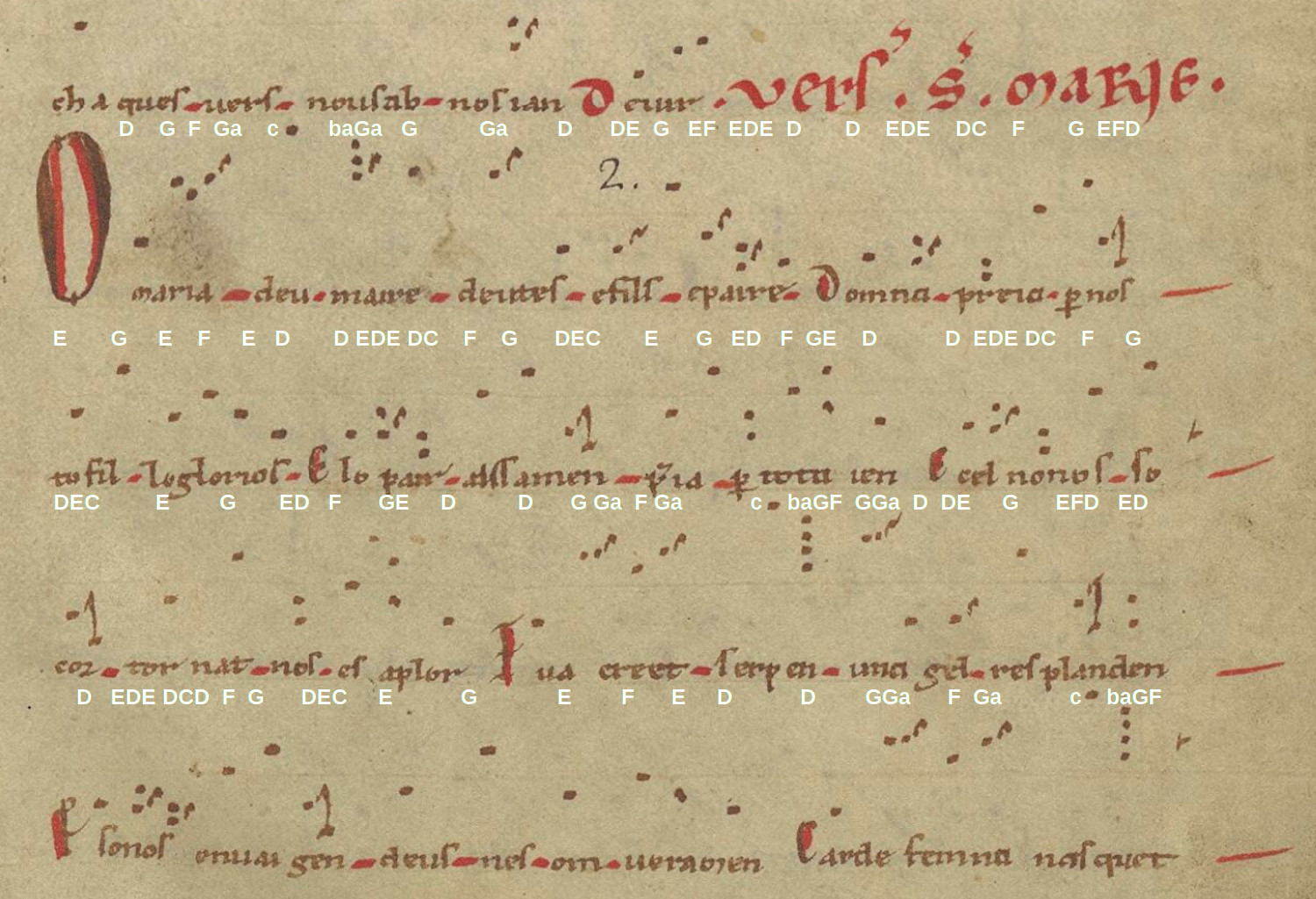
Melody of the versus «O maria deu maire» notated by Aquitanian neumes (F-Pn lat. 1139, f.49r)

=== Medieval solmization and the use of diesis ===
The question of microtones and where b quadratum (b mi) and b rotundum (b fa) should be used, is a matter of musical interpretation. Concerning the beginning of the first stanza the hexachordum durum on G ut would be quite in order also to expose the Dorian octave species (unfortunately many Ensembles ruin it by singing constantly b flat, but the Dorian mode should not be confused with D minor). The second stanza «Eva creet serpen» could even employ a tritone (going further down to F fa) to underline the meaning of the text and it is possible that here the melody was meant to make a cadence on b instead of on a re like at the analogue parts. Concerning the use of diesis the notator of the late eleventh-century part used particularly shaped virgae (inspired by the Gallican neume called «pes stratus») such as at «t'es e fils». Thus, the step DE requires a higher intonation for the second note.

=== Adaption to the poetic composition ===
Since all stanzas have been provided with neumes, the adaption of the melody to the verses can be studied. The melody of the piece is strophic, it basically repeats for each stanza with only minor variations. Right at the beginning of the fifth verse, the second stanza seems in content so closely related to the preceding verses (it completes grammatically the fourth verse) that the well exposed melodic incipit was simply suppressed and replaced by a variant of the melodic phrase that precedes it (usually each phrase combines two verses which reveals that the versus was closely linked to the sequence: ABB'B', A'B etc.). Thus, the notated example is unique to study the freedom of the singer to adapt the melody to a different number of syllables in certain verses, but also to combine two stanzas as one right at the beginning of the versus.

== The liturgical and courtly context of Occitan poetry ==
Concerning its Dorian church tone, similarities have been drawn between the music of O Maria and that of a ninth-century hymn to the Virgin, Ave maris stella ("Hail, star of the sea"), and also between O Maria and Reis glorios, verais lums e clardatz ("Glorious King, true light and brilliance"), an alba by the troubadour Giraut de Bornelh (fl.c.1200). Although musicologists like to employ terms like contrafactum or parody technique (especially when a vernacular poem replaces liturgical verses), the latter was very likely a tropus of an assimilated melody in the literal sense that Giraut composed over a given melody to create his vernacular alba. The example shows that methods of Latin hymnographers used for versus, sequence and tropus also applied for later troubadour songs, especially in such a rare case where the model used already the same language.

Even if this relationship might not prove that the older part of the Troper Proser Sequentiary was written close to William IX or around Cluny, as Jacques Chailley once assumed, there is as well a monastic influence concerning an interaction between oral and written transmission in poetry and song and a new importance of the liturgical or para-liturgical genre versus during the eleventh century whose innovation was experiments with polyphony, but also with local languages, and even bilinguality.

== Source ==
- "Paris, Bibliothèque nationale, fonds latin, Ms. 1139, f. 49r-50r". Troper Proser Sequentiary of the Abbey Saint-Martial at Limoges (11th-13th centuries) [St-M A].

== Text editions ==
- Rochegude, Henri Pascal de, ed. (1819). Le Parnasse Occitanien ou choix de Poësies Originales des Troubadours, tirées des manuscrits nationaux [The Occitan Parnassus or selection of original Troubadours verses taken from national manuscripts]. Toulouse: Benichet Cadet. pp. xx–xxii.
- Brittain, Frederick, ed. (1962). The Penguin book of Latin verse with plain prose translations of each poem. Harmondsworth etc.: Penguin.
- Chickering, Howell D.; Switten, Margaret, eds. (1988). Anthology I: Monastic song, Troubadour song, German song, Trouvère song. The medieval lyric. Vol. 1. South Hadley, Mass.: Mount Holyoke College. pp. 21–29.

== English translation ==
- Paden, William D.; Paden, Frances Freeman, eds. (2007). Troubadour Poems from the South of France. Cambridge, Mass.: B. S. Brewer. pp. 18–19. ISBN 978-1-84384-129-6. JSTOR 10.7722/j.ctt14brw1v.

== Studies ==
- Carlson, Rachel G. (2003). "Striking Ornaments: Complexities of Sense and Song in Aquitanian 'Versus'". Music & Letters. 84 (4): 527–556. JSTOR 3525921.
- Chailley, Jacques (1955). "Les premiers troubadours et les versus de l'école d'Aquitaine" [The first troubadours und the versus of the Aquitanian school]. Romania. 76 (302–2): 212–239. JSTOR 45045859.
- Colette, Marie-Noël (1990). "La notation du demi-ton dans le manuscrit Paris, B. N. Lat. 1139 et dans quelques manuscrits du Sud de la France" [The semitonium notation used in the manuscript Pa 1139 and in some other manuscripts of Southern France]. In Claudio Leonardi, Enrico Menestò (ed.). La tradizione dei tropi liturgici : Atti dei Convegni sui Tropi Liturgici, Parigi (15 - 19 ottobre 1985) - Perugia (2 - 5 settembre 1987). Biblioteca del "Centro per il Collegamento degli Studi Medievali e Umanistici nell'Università di Perugia", 3. Spoleto: Centro Italiano di Studi sull'Alto Medioevo. pp. 297–311.
- Crocker, Richard L. (2001). "Versus (Lat.)". Grove Music Online. doi:10.1093/gmo/9781561592630.article.29247.
- Gastoué, Amédée (1924). Le Cantique populaire en France : Ses sources, son histoire augmentée d'une bibliographie générale des anciens cantiques et noe͏̈ls [The popular church song in France: Its sources, its history completed by a general bibliography of the old church and Christmas hymns]. Bibliothèque de l'art musical religieux. Lyon: Janin.
- Hains, John D. (2004). Eight Centuries of Troubadours and Trouvères : the Changing Identity of Medieval Music. Cambridge: Cambridge UP. ISBN 9780521826723.
- O'Sullivan, Daniel E. (2013). "Na Maria: Shaping Marian Devotion in Old Occitan Song". In Daniel E. O'Sullivan, Laurie Shepard (ed.). Shaping Courtliness in Medieval France: Essays in Honor of Matilda Tomaryn Bruckner. Gallica. Vol. 28. Cambridge, Mass.: D. S. Brewer. pp. 183–200. ISBN 978-1-84384-335-1. JSTOR 10.7722/j.ctt24hfpt.17.
- Spanke, Hans (1931). "St. Martial-Studien. Ein Beitrag zur frühromanischen Metrik (Fortsetzung)" [Saint-Martial Studies: a contribution to metre in early Romance poetry (continuation)]. Zeitschrift für französische Sprache und Literatur. 54 (7/8): 385–422. JSTOR 40615197.
- Treitler, Leo (2003). With Voice and Pen : Coming to Know Medieval Song and How It Was Made. Oxford, New York: Oxford UP. ISBN 978-0-19-816644-3.
