= Mahmoud Zoufonoun =

Mahmoud Zoufonoun محمود ذوالفنون
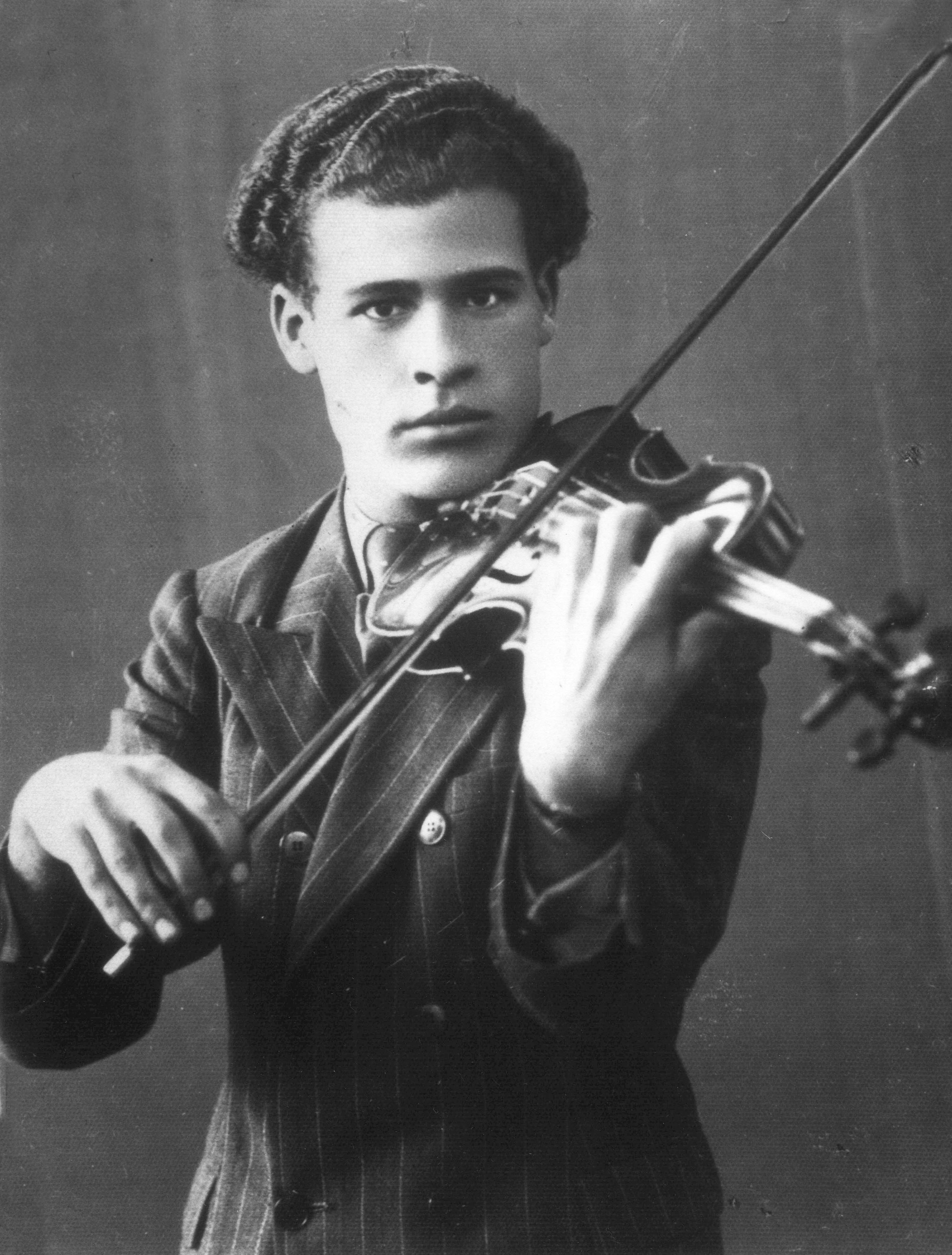
- Zoufonoun in his early 20s, circa 1940.

Background information
- Also known as: Ostad Mahmoud Zoufonoun
- Born: 1 January 1920; Shiraz, Iran
- Died: 19 October 2013 (aged 93) Bay Area, California, United States
- Genres: Persian traditional
- Occupation: Musician
- Instrument: Violin
- Years active: 1928–2013
- Formerly of: Zoufonoun Ensemble

Ostad ("Master") Mahmoud Zoufonoun (Persian: محمود ذوالفنون, sometimes pronounced "Zolfonoon" or "Zolfonun"; 1 January 1920 – 19 October 2013) was an Iranian-born American musician accomplished in the art of Persian traditional music.

== Life and career ==
Zoufonoun's interest in music began after he secretly listened to his father (Habib Zoufonoun) playing and teaching the tar. Habib began teaching his son the instrument at age 8. Aged twelve, already having become a local teacher for tar, Zoufonoun became interested in the violin. Since he was unable to obtain an instrument of his own he designed and made his own instrument.

In the 1930s Zoufonoun moved to Shiraz where he learned musical notes from a clarinet teacher and took lessons in the violin. In 1936 (aged 16) Zoufonoun, at the prompting of his first violin teacher Mr. Vaziritabar, moved to Tehran where he took lessons from Rouben Gregorian. In the early 1940s Zoufonoun began playing solo's on Radio Iran. In 1942 he helped form Anjomane Mooseeghee Melli where he met Rouhollah Khaleghi (who conducted the orchestra).

Zoufonoun worked as a soloist, composer, arranger and conductor at the National Radio and Television. He was a member of the "Golha orchestra". Over the course of his career he has made efforts to compile, transcribe a compilation of regional folk songs, modes, and styles to date. The work is currently uncompleted.

Following his retirement in 1976 from the National Radio and Television, Mahmoud and his family emigrated to the US. He continued to teach and compose and perform traditional Persian music, usually with his sons as the Zoufonoun Ensemble.

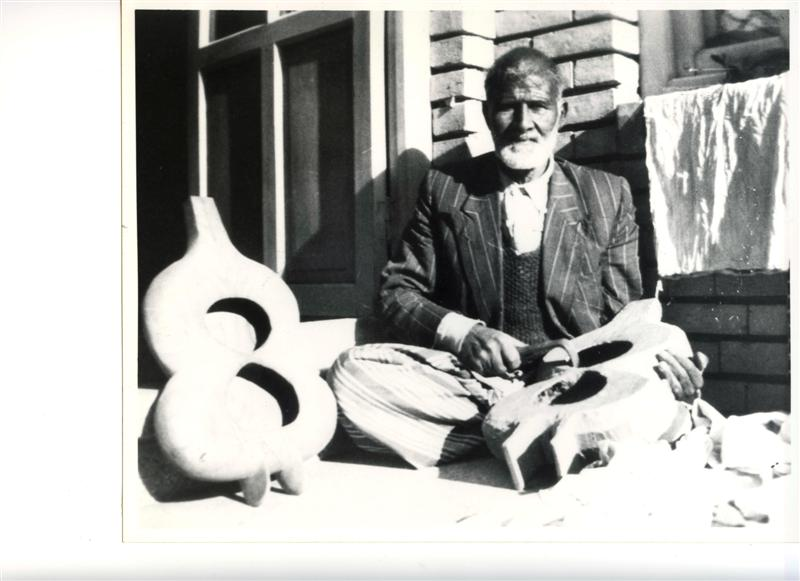
Photograph of Habib Zoufonoun (Mahmoud's father) making his own tar

== Teaching ==
Zoufonoun also taught violin. Until his death, he gave lessons in his private studio and previously taught at the National School for Iranian Music (of which he was a founding member), The Shabaneh Adult Art School, Institute for the Arts, The University of Tehran, and The Danesh-e Sarah-e Honar.

== Honors ==
On January 20, 2007, Z Venue, an arts non-profit organization located in Santa Clara County, presented "A Tribute to Mahmoud Zoufonoun" in the Palace of Fine Arts Theatre, San Francisco.

== Notable compositions ==
- Concerto Dashti for Symphony Orchestra
- Tareneh Bayateh Tork (Golha Orchestra; Banan singing)
- Taraneh Mahour: "Gol-o-Zaari" (Lyrics by Hafez)
- Naghd-e-Sufi: Suite in Rastpanjgah, including several original Taranehs ("Bovad-aya", "Naghd-e-Sufi", "Baba Taher")
- Faash-Mee-Gooyam: Suite in Chahargah, including original Taranehs ("Sheydaee", "Narm Narmak", "Faash-Mee-Gooyam")
- Heelat-Raha-Kon: Suite in Oshagh, including original Taraneh "Heelat-Raha-Kon"
- Anthem in Chahargah: "Vatan" (Lyrics by Simin Behbahani)

== See also ==
- Jalal Zolfonun (Zoufonoun)
- Composers of Traditional Persian Music
