= Dastgah =

Persian musical system

Dastgah (/dæstˈɡɑː/; Persian: دستگاه, romanized: Dastgāh, Classical: [dastˈɡɑːh], Iran: [dæstˈɡɒː(h)]) is the standard musical system in Persian art music, standardised in the 19th century following the transition of Persian music from the Maqam modal system.

A dastgāh consists of a collection of musical melodies, gushehs. In a song played in a given dastgah, a musician starts with an introductory gusheh, and then meanders through various different gushehs, evoking different moods. Many gushehs in a given dastgah are related to an equivalent musical mode in Western music.

For example, most gushehs in Dastgāh-e Māhur correspond to the Ionian mode in the Major scale, whilst most gushehs in Dastgāh-e Shur correspond to the Phrygian mode.

In spite of 50 or more extant dastgāhs, 12 are most commonly played, with Dastgāh-e Šur and Dastgāh-e Māhur being referred to as the mothers of all dastgahs.

== Summary ==
Each dastgāh consists of seven basic notes, plus several variable notes used for ornamentation and modulation. Each dastgāh is a certain modal variety subject to a course of development (sayr) that is determined by the pre-established order of sequences, and revolves around 365 central core melodies known as gushehs (each of these melodies being a gusheh), which musicians come to know through experience and absorption. This process of centonization is personal, and it is a tradition of great subtlety and depth. The full collection of gushehs in all dastgāhs is referred to as the radif. During the meeting of The Inter-governmental Committee for the Safeguarding of the Intangible Heritage of the United Nations, held between 28 September – 2 October 2009 in Abu Dhabi, radifs were officially registered on the UNESCO List of the Intangible Cultural Heritage of Humanity.

The system of twelve dastgāhs and gushehs has remained nearly the same as it was codified by the music masters of the nineteenth century, in particular Mîrzā Abdollāh Farāhāni (1843–1918). No new dastgāh or large gusheh has been devised since that codification. When in the modern times an āvāz or a dastgāh has been developed, it has almost always been through borrowings from the extant dastgāhs and gushehs, rather than through unqualified invention. From this remarkable stability one may infer that the system must have achieved "canonical" status in Iran.

== Terminology ==
The term dastgāh has often been compared to the musical mode in Western musicology, but this is inaccurate. A dastgāh is usually the name of the initial mode of a piece, which the music returns to—and moreover, a dastgāh identifies a group of modes grouped according to tradition. In short, a dastgāh is both the collective title of a grouping of modes and the initial mode of each group.

According to musicians themselves, the etymology of the term dastgāh is associated with "the position (gāh) of the hand (dast) [on the neck of the instrument]". The Persian term dastgah can be translated as "system", and dastgāh is then "first and foremost a collection of discrete and heterogeneous elements organized into a hierarchy that is entirely coherent though nevertheless flexible."

In conventional classifications of Persian music, Abū ʿAṭā, Dashti, Afshāri, and Bayāt-e Tork are considered sub-classes of Šur dastgāh. Likewise, Bayāt-e Esfahān is a sub-class of Homāyun, reducing the number of principal dastgāhs to a total of seven. A sub-class in the conventional system is referred to as āvāz.

=== Distinguished pitches ===
Koron (half flat) sign

A dastgāh is more than a set of notes, and one component of the additional structure making up each dastgāh is which pitches are singled out for various musical functions.

Examples include:

==== Finalis ====
It's so named because it usually functions as the goal or destination tone that melodic cadences end on when they have a conclusory feel. This is also sometimes referred to as "tonic" but some authors avoid that usage because "tonic" is associated with Western tonality.

==== Āghāz ('beginning') ====
It's the pitch on which an improvisation in a dastgāh usually begins. In some dastgāhs it is different from the finalis while in others it is the same pitch.

==== Ist ('stop') ====
It's a pitch other than the finalis which often serves as the ending note for phrases other than final cadences

==== Shāhed ('witness') ====
It's a particularly prominent pitch.

==== Moteghayyer ('changeable') ====
It's a variable note – one that consistently appears as two distinct pitches, which can be used alternately in different contexts or at the performer's discretion.

== The Seven Dastgahs ==
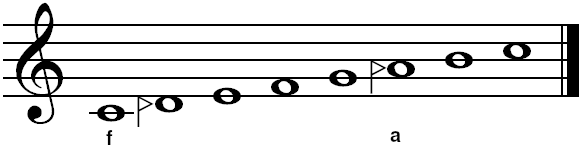
Chahargah

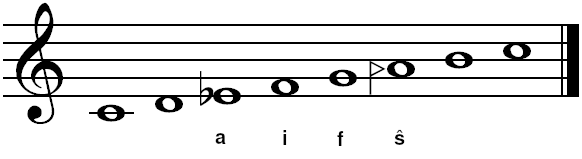
Homayoun

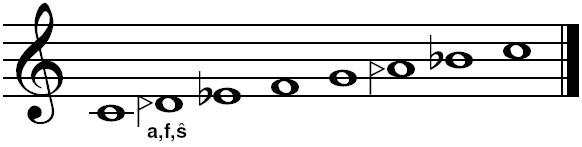
Segah

Bayat-e Tork (audio file played on Santur.

Segah (audio file played on Santur.

Nava (audio file played on Santur.

Homayun (audio file played on Santur.

Chahargah (audio file played on Santur.

Mahur (audio file played on Santur.

Rast-Panjgah (audio file played on Santur.

Most scholars divide the traditional Persian art music to seven dastgāhs. Others divide them into 12 dastgāhs by counting Abu Ata, Dashti, Afshari, Bayat-e Kord and Bayat-e Esfahan as separate dastgāhs rather than subcategories of other dastgāhs.

Those who categorize the traditional Persian art music into seven dastgāhs often also list seven āvāzes (Persian: آواز, which means songs) in conjunction with these dastgāhs.

The following is a list of the seven dastgāhs and seven āvāzes:

=== Common Dastgah and Avaz ===
There are listed in order as per the radif (music) of Mirza Abdollah.

Flats are shown with a ׳♭׳. Koron (half flats) are shown with a ׳p׳.

- Shur شور (C^{a} D^{f} Ep F G A/Ap^{m} B♭ C)
  - Bayat-e-tork بیات ترک (C^{a,i} D Ep F^{f,ŝ} G A B♭ C)
  - Dashti دشتی (C D^{f} E♭ F^{a} G A/Ap^{m,ŝ} B♭ C)
  - Abu-ata ابوعطا (C D^{f} Eb^{a,i} F G^{a,ŝ} Ap B♭/Bp C)
  - Afshari افشاری (C^{f} D E♭^{i} F G^{a,ŝ} Ap/A^{m} B♭ C)
- Segah سه‌گاه (C D/Dp Ep^{a,f,ŝ} F G Ap B♭ C)
- Nava نوا (C D Ep^{i} F^{a} G^{f} A B♭ C)
- Homayun همایون (C D E♭^{a} F^{i} G^{f} Ap^{ŝ} B C)
  - Bayat-e-Esfahan (also called simply Esfahan) اصفهان (C D Ep^{i} F♯ G^{a,f,ŝ} A B♭ C)
- Chahargah چهارگاه (C^{f} Dp E F G Ap^{a} B C)
- Mahur ماهور (C^{a,f} D^{ŝ} E F G A B C)
- Rast-Panjgah راست‌ پنجگاه (C D E F^{a,f} G A B♭ C)

Less common are:

- Bayat-e-kord (C D E♭ F G Ap B♭ C) (Sometimes included as an Avaz under Shur)
- Shushtar (Sometimes included as an Avaz under Homayun, but usually just as a gushe)

Note that in some cases the sub-classes (āvāzs) are counted as individual dastgāhs, yet this contradicts technicalities in Iranian music.

== See also ==
- Persian traditional music
- Persian maqam

== Sources ==
- Caton, Margaret (1988). "Bayāt-e Tork". Encyclopaedia Iranica.
- Caton, Margaret (1990). "Bayāt-e Eṣfahān". Encyclopaedia Iranica.
- Caton, Margaret (2004). "Bayāt-e Kord". Encyclopaedia Iranica.
- During, Jean (1994). "Dastgāh". Encyclopaedia Iranica.
- During, Jean (1996). "Daštī". Encyclopaedia Iranica.
- During, Jean (2004). "Homāyun". Encyclopaedia Iranica.
- Farhat, Hormoz (1984). "Afšārī". Encyclopaedia Iranica.
- Farhat, Hormoz (2004). The Dastgah Concept in Persian Music. Cambridge University Press. ISBN 0-521-54206-5.
- Nettl, Bruno (1990). "Čahārgāh". Encyclopaedia Iranica.
- Safvat, Daryush; Caron, Nelly (1966). Iran: les Traditions Musicales. Paris: Editions Buchet/chastel.
- Tsuge, Gen'ichi (1983). "Abū ʿAṭā". Encyclopaedia Iranica. Archived from the original on 2015-06-27.
