= Afshari (surname) =

Afshari is a surname. Notable people with the surname include:

- Ali Afshari (born 1973), Iranian activist
- Reza Afshari, Iranian historian.
- Saba Kord Afshari, is an Iranian political prisoner.
- Nader Shah or Nader Shah Afshari, founder of the Afsharid dynasty of Iran.

== See also ==
- Afshar language, Turkic language
- Afshari (music), an avaz of the Dastgah system of Iranian/Persian classical music
