= Finalis =

In maqam music theory, finalis is the name of the note in a maqam where the mode "rests" (stops). For most maqams, this is also the tonic note.

In Persian traditional music, where the maqam classification has been replaced with the dastgah system, the concept finalist prevails into the definition of dastgah, where it is known as the stop note (Persian: نت ایست).
