= Bayat e Kurd =

Bayat e Kurd, also transliterated as Bayat-e Kord or in full as Avaz-e Bayat-e Kord (Persian:بیات کرد) (Kurdish:بیاتی کورد) is a part of Dastgāh-e Šur in Iranian classical music. in the past it was cited as a branch of Chahargah.

== Etymology ==
The name of this branch of Iranian music refers to its Kurdish folklore origins.
