= Zoufonoun Ensemble =

Persian classical music group

- Origin: San Francisco Bay Area, California, U.S.
- Genres: Persian classical music
- Years active: ?–2013
- Members: Mahmoud Zoufonoun (violin), Amir Zoufonoun (vocals, setar), Ramin Zoufonoun (tar, Persian-tuned piano), Amin Zoufonoun (setar), Omid Zoufonoun

The Zoufonoun Ensemble was an American Persian classical music group, consisting of Mahmoud Zoufonoun (violin) and his four sons Amir Zoufonoun (vocals, setar), Ramin Zoufonoun (tar, Persian-tuned piano), Amin Zoufonoun (setar), and Omid Zoufonoun (cello). The ensemble was based in the San Francisco Bay Area.

== History ==
A variety of percussionists have performed with the group, including Shahram Kazemi, Houman Pourmehdi, and Siamak Pouyan.

The group performs large-scale suites composed by Mahmoud Zoufonoun while presenting vocal and instrumental improvisations by each member. Notable among these compositions is Naghde Sufi (suite in the mode of Rastpanjgah), and Fash Migooyam (suite in the mode of Chahargah). In recent years, through the addition of cello, Omid Zoufonoun has expanded the compositions to include elements of Western counterpoint and harmony.

Based in the San Francisco Bay Area, the Zoufonoun Ensemble has performed throughout the United States, including such venues as the Museum of Fine Arts, Boston, Herbst Theatre, and the Palace of Fine Arts.

In 2013, Mahmoud Zoufonoun died.

== See also ==
- Iranian music
- Mastan Ensemble
