= Persian maqam =

Term in Persian classical music

Persian maqam (Persian: مقام) is a notion in Persian classical music.

Quoting Nooshin,

The distinction between gusheh and mode is rarely discussed in the literature, but is often implied in the terminology used. Of those who do discuss this (briefly), Hormoz Farhat suggests that the Persian maqām ('position') is equivalent to 'mode', and certainly prior to the development of the dastgāh system, this would have been the main local term signifying mode or melody-type (as still used in related traditions in the region. Indeed, until recently, some musicians still used 'maqām' to refer to individual 'dastgāh's.

According to Farhat,

Before the development of the system of the twelve dastgāhs, traditional music was known under the genus of various maqāms. In Turkey and in the Arabic-speaking countries, the maqāmāt (Arabic plural for maqām) is still the basis of classical music. [...] In Persian music, more analogous to maqām is māye, a word with increasing usage signifying precisely what is meant by a maqām elsewhere.

Persian maqams have also been known in South Asia. The Sanskrit theorist Pundarika Vitthala noted the names of the Persian maqams in his sixteenth-century treatise Ragamanjari.

== See also ==
- Turkish makam
- Arabic maqam
