= Nusach (Jewish music) =

Jewish musical style

- Stylistic origins: Jewish liturgical music
- Cultural origins: Ancient Jewish prayer traditions
- Typical instruments: Voice
- Derivative forms: Cantorial music; Jewish folk melodies influenced by liturgical modes

Subgenres
- Ahavah Rabbah; Ukrainian Dorian; Magein Avot; Yishtabach; Adonai Malach

Other topics
- Cantillation; Maqam; Ashkenazi music; Mizrahi music; Cantor (hazzan)

In Judaism, musical nusach refers the musical style or tradition of a community, particularly the chant used for recitative prayers such as the Amidah.

This is distinct from textual nusach, the exact text of the prayer service, which varies somewhat between Jewish communities.

== Description ==
The whole musical style or tradition of a community is sometimes referred to as its nusach, but this term is most often used in connection with the chants used for recitative passages, in particular the Amidah.

Many of the passages in the prayer book, such as the Amidah and the Psalms, are chanted in a recitative rather than either read in normal speech or sung to a rhythmical tune. The recitatives follow a system of musical modes, somewhat like the maqamat of Arabic music. For example, Ashkenazi cantorial practice distinguishes a number of steiger (scales) named after the prayers in which they are most frequently used, such as the Adonoi malach steiger and the Ahavoh rabboh steiger. Mizrahi communities such as the Syrian Jews use the full maqam system.

The scales used may vary both with the particular prayer and with the season. For examples, there are often special modes for the High Holy Days, and in Syrian practice the scale used depends on the Torah reading for the week (see The Weekly Maqam). In some cases the actual melodies are fixed, while in others the reader has freedom of improvisation.

== Musical modes ==
Jewish liturgical music is characterized by a set of musical modes.

The prayer modes form part of what is known as the musical nusach (tradition) of a community, and serve both to identify different types of prayer and to link those prayers to the time of year or even time of day in which they are set. Various Jewish traditions developed their own modal systems, such as the maqamat of the Middle Eastern Jewish communities. The modes discussed in this article are specific to the traditions of Eastern European (Ashkenazi) Jewish Communities.

There are three main modes, as well as a number of combined or compound modes. The three main modes are called Ahavah Rabbah, Magein Avot and Adonai Malach. Traditionally, the cantor (hazzan) improvised sung prayers within the designated mode, while following a general structure of how each prayer should sound. Over time many of these chants have been written down and standardized, yet the practice of improvisation still exists to this day. Early studies in the history of Jewish Prayer Modes concluded that the musical scales used were based upon ancient Biblical cantillation, but modern scholarship has questioned the validity of these findings.

=== Ahavah Rabbah mode ===
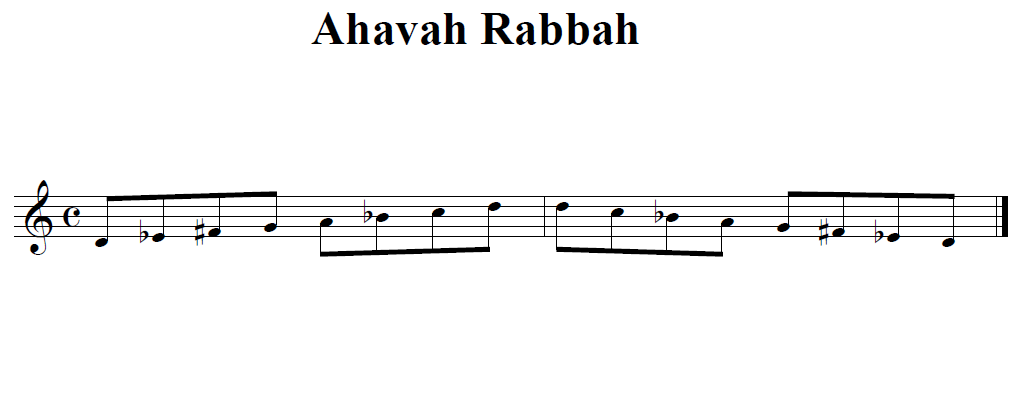
Basic Ahavah Rabbah scale

The Ahavah Rabbah mode – sometimes referred to as Freygish (Phrygian dominant) – is named after the blessing that immediately precedes the Sh'ma in the morning service. This blessing begins with the words Ahavah Rabbah (literally: great love), and describes how God's love for Israel is manifest through God's revelation of Torah. Musically, Ahavah Rabbah is considered to be the most Jewish-sounding of all the prayer modes, because of the interval of a flattened second, creating an augmented second interval between the second and third scale degrees. This mode is used in the beginning of the weekday evening service through the Chatzi Kaddish, a large portion of the weekday morning service, parts of the Shabbat morning service, and occasionally on the High Holidays. The Ahavah Rabbah mode is also used in many Jewish folk songs, such as "Hava Nagila", and popular liturgical melodies, such as "Yismechu". It is similar to the Arabic maqam Hijaz, but whereas the dominant of Hijaz is on the fourth degree, Ahavah Rabbah strongly favors the third.

==== Ukrainian Dorian mode ====
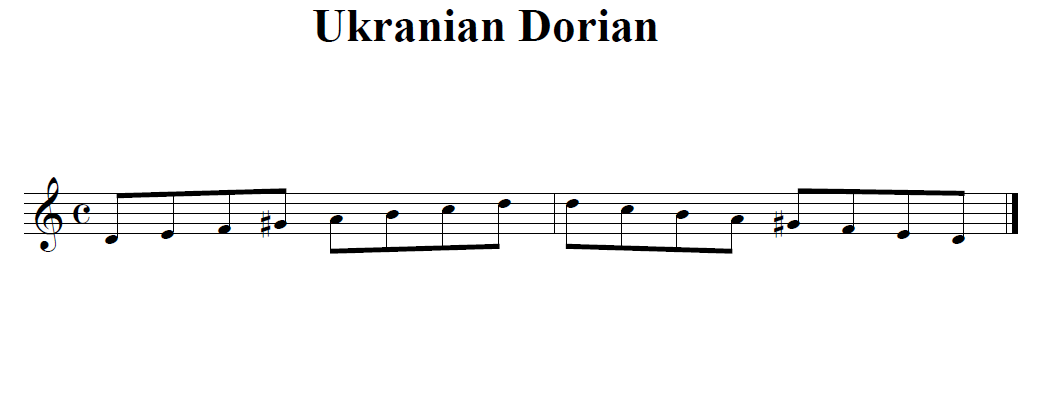
Basic Ukrainian Dorian scale

The Ukrainian Dorian mode (also known as Mi sheberach mode) is a combined scale built upon the seventh degree of the Ahavah Rabbah scale. It is also closely related to the Magein Avot mode, in that a pre-concluding phrase in Ukrainian Dorian can cadence on its supertonic, which is the 5th degree of the relative Magein Avot scale. This happens quite often in the nusach for the Three Festivals. It is similar to the Arabic maqam Nikriz.

=== Magein Avot mode ===
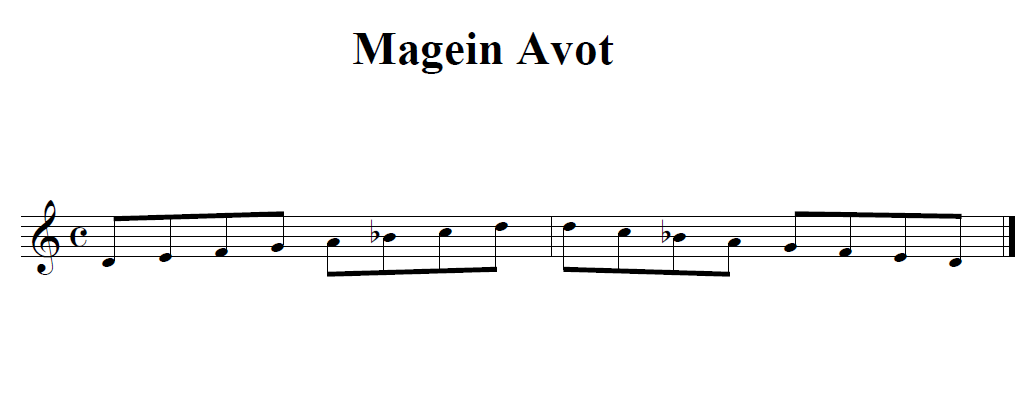
Basic Magein Avot scale

The Magein Avot (literally: Shield of our Fathers) mode takes its name from a paragraph in the Me'ein Sheva prayer, which directly follows the Amidah in the Friday evening service. Musically, it most closely resembles a minor scale from the Western classical music tradition or the Arabic maqam Nahawand. It is used in simple davening, or prayer chant, often by means of a single recitation tone, which the cantor uses to cover a large amount of liturgical text in a quickly-flowing style. The simplicity of both the mode and the chanting associated with it is meant to reflect the peaceful atmosphere of Shabbat. When chanting in the Magein Avot mode, it is common for the cantor to pivot into the relative major at certain liturgical points, often to highlight a particular line of text. It is this use of the relative major, in concert with Magein Avot, that distinguishes the mode from a regular minor scale. In addition to Shabbat evening, the Magein Avot mode is also prominent for the opening blessings of the weekday morning and afternoon services.

==== Yishtabach mode ====
The Yishtabach mode is a variant of the Magein Avot scale that flattens the second scale degree. This scale resembles the Western Phrygian scale or the Arabic maqam Kurd.

=== Adonai (HaShem) Malach mode ===
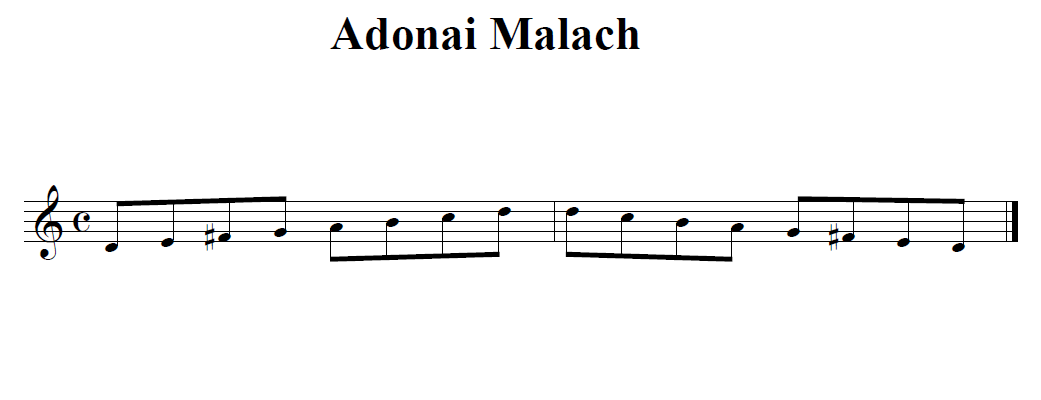
Basic Adonai Malach scale (Adonai malakh mode on D)

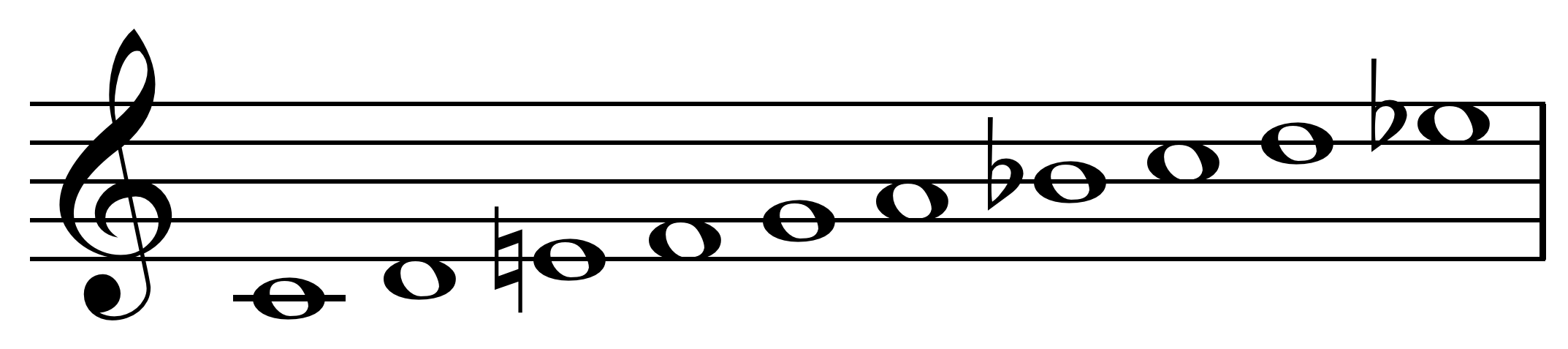
Adonai malakh mode on C.

The Adonai malach (literally: God Reigns) mode consists of a major scale with a lowered (minor) seventh and tenth. This mode has a majestic feel to it and is used for a number of services that require a grand atmosphere. Traditionally, it is used for psalms 95–99 in Kabbalat Shabbat, Lekhah Dodi in Kabbalat Shabbat, and the Friday night Kiddush. On Shabbat morning it is used for the Avot and G'vurot, during the Torah service, and on Rosh Chodesh when blessing the new month. Adonai Malach mode is also used at various times during the High Holidays when a majestic quality is required, such as the Shofar service, and parts of the Amidah. In High Holiday contexts, the seventh and tenth degrees are often raised, causing the mode to strongly resemble the classical major scale.

"Adonai malakh" ("God is King"), a line from Psalm 93, is set using the Adonai malakh scale at the close of the introduction to the Kabalat Shabat (Friday evening synagogue service).

It adds flats as it goes higher, and its pitch set is similar to the Persian Dastgāh-e Māhur and Russian Obikhod scale.

== Maneuvers ==
Maneuvers are used within prayer chants in order to change the mood and mode during prayer. There are a few characteristic moves that cantors tend to use in order to modulate through various modes. Two of the most common maneuvers are the Yishtabach maneuver and the Sim Shalom maneuver.

=== Yishtabach maneuver ===
The Yishtabach maneuver moves from Magein Avot to Adonai Malach on the 4th degree of the scale. It then moves through Ukrainian Dorian and back to Magein Avot. This maneuver helps to highlight the grandeur of the proclamation of God's name that occurs in the final blessing of the Shabbat morning service.

=== Sim Shalom maneuver ===
The Sim Shalom maneuver, which is named after the Sim Shalom prayer, in which it often occurs, begins in Ahavah Rabbah, and modulates to the major key on the fourth degree of the scale. It also uses Ukrainian Dorian as a shift back to the original Ahavah Rabbah.

== Works cited ==
- Cohon, Baruch Joseph. "The Structure of Synagogue Prayer Chant." Journal of the American Musicological Society 3, no. 1, 17–32, 1950.
