= Bayat e Turk =

Traditional Iranian music

Bayat e Turk (Persian:بیات ترک) or Bayat e Zand (Persian:بیات زند) is a part of Dastgah-e Shur in Iranian traditional music. Some religious texts, like Adhan, are sung in this mode.

== Etymology ==
The term "Turk" refers to the Turkic Qashqai people of Southern Iran, and does not refer to Turkmen People or Azeri People.This is thought to be because the folk songs of the Qashqai tribe are often sung in this manner.

== Branches ==
This mode has some branches including:

- Daramad e Avval (first preface)
- Daramad Dovvom (second preface)
- Daramad Sevvom (third preface)
- Dogah
- Ruholarwah
- Jame daran
- Mahdizarrabi
- Zangooleh
- Bastenegar
- Naghme
- Feili
- Khosrawani
- Haji Hassani
- Mehrabani
