= Dastgah-e Homayun =

Dastgāh-e Homayun (Persian: دستگاه همايون; Azerbaijani: Hümayun) is a musical modal system in traditional mugham music and one of the seven dastgāhs of Persian Music (Persian classical music is organized into seven dastgāhs and five Āvāzes; however, from a purely technical point of view, one can consider them as an ensemble of 12 dastgāhs).

This is the seventh mode and consists of 0.5+1.5+0.5 tone, which is created in amalgamation of two tetra-chords with the fourth method. It is able to get sound line of Shushtar mode by changing the tetra-chords’ places in Humayun mode. So, these two modes’ structures are close to each other. It creates deeply mournful feelings at listener. Subgenres of Humayun are: Bardasht, Humayun, Baxtiyari, Feili, Boyuk Masnavi, Movlavi, Shushtar, Tarkib, Uzzal or Bidad, Kichik Masnavi.
