= Avaz (music) =

Avaz, or Awaz (Persian: آواز) is an unmetered vocal section of a mode in Persian music.

In the years 1965 and 1966, Mahmud Karimi (maestro of Persian vocal music) performed the whole Avazs which were recorded and transcribed by Mohammad-Taghi Massoudieh. This version was published in 1997 in Tehran.
