= Afshari (Persian music) =

Avaz e Afshari (Persian:آواز افشاری) is a branch of Dastgah-e Shur in Persian classical music. Historically, it has been regarded as an independent modal system within Iranian music. Afshari is known for its deep sense of melancholy, often featuring both sorrowful and plaintive melodies, as well as more serene and pleasant compositions.

== Branches ==
This mode has some branches including:

- Daramad (preface)
- Jame daran
- Hesar
- Araq
- Hazin
- Nahib
- Rahawi
- Qara'i
- Masnavi
- Sadri
