= Persian traditional music =

Aspect of Iranian culture

Persian traditional music or Iranian traditional music, also known as Persian classical music or Iranian classical music, refers to the classical music of Iran (historically known as Persia). It consists of characteristics developed through the country's classical, medieval, and contemporary eras. It also influenced areas and regions that are considered part of Greater Iran.

Due to the exchange of musical science throughout history, many of Iran's classical modes are related to those of its neighboring cultures.

Iran's classical art music continues to function as a spiritual tool, as it has throughout history, and much less of a recreational activity. It belongs, for the most part, to the social elite, as opposed to the folkloric and popular music, in which the society as a whole participates. However, components of Iran's classical music have also been incorporated into folk and pop music compositions.

== History ==
The history of musical development in Iran dates back thousands of years. Archaeological records attributed to the Elam in the southwest and of Oxus in the northeast, demonstrate musical traditions in prehistoric times.

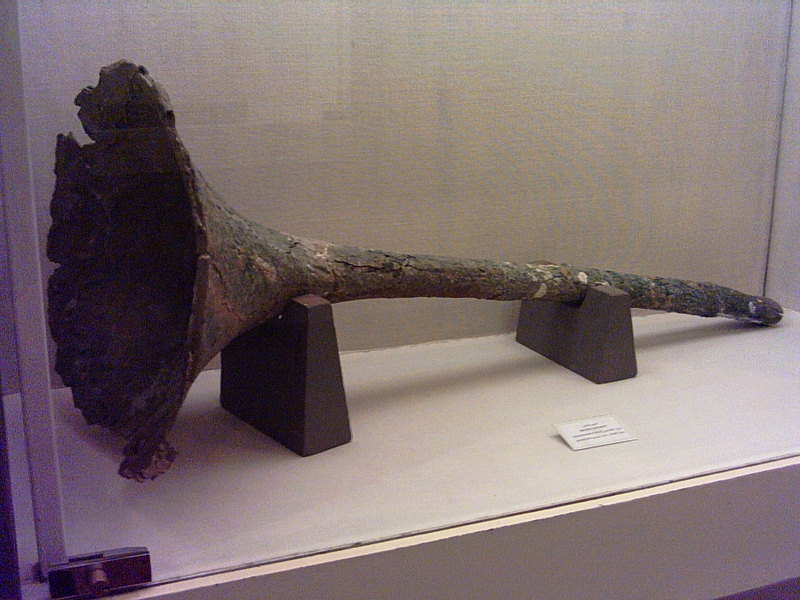
Karna, an Iranian musical instrument from the 6th century BC, kept at the Persepolis Museum.

Little is known about the music of the classical Iranian empires of the Medes, the Achaemenids, and the Parthians. However, an elaborate musical scene is revealed through various fragmentary documents, including those that were observed at the court and in public theaters and those that accompanied religious rituals and battle preparations. Jamshid, a king in Iranian mythology, is credited with the "invention" of music.

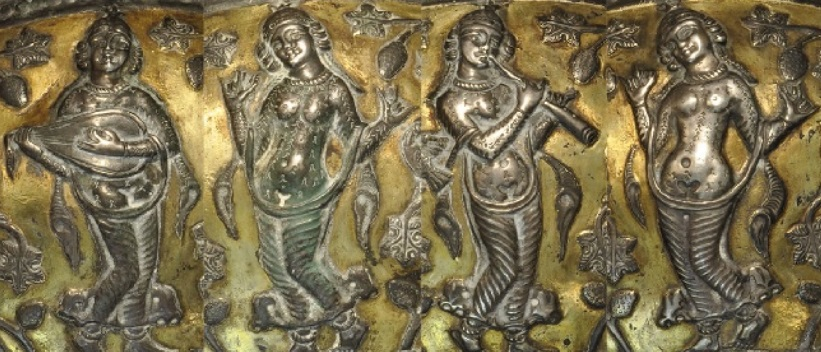
Dancers and musicians depicted on a 5th-7th century Sasanian bowl.

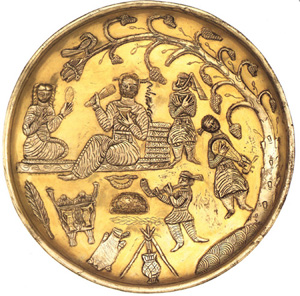
7th-century Sasanian musicians plate, kept at the British Museum.

The history of Sasanian music is better documented than the earlier periods, and the names of various instruments and court musicians from the reign of the Sasanians have been attested. Under the Sasanian rule, modal music was developed by a poet-musician of the court named Barbad, who is remembered in many documents. He may have invented the lute and the musical tradition that was to transform into the forms of dastgah and maqam. He has been credited to have organized a musical system consisting of seven "royal modes" (xosrovāni), 30 derived modes (navā), and 360 melodies (dāstān).

Khosrow II was a great patron of music, and his court musician, Barbad, was said to have developed a musical system with seven modal structures (known as the Royal Modes), thirty derivative modes, and 365 melodies, associated with the days of the week, month and year".

Iran's academic classical music, in addition to preserving melody types attributed to Sasanian musicians, is based on the theories of sonic aesthetics as expounded by the likes of Iranian musical theorists in the early centuries of after the Muslim conquest of the Sasanian Empire, most notably Avicenna, Farabi, Qotb-ed-Din Shirazi, and Safi-ed-Din Urmawi.

It is also linked directly to the music of the 16th–18th-century Safavid Empire. During the 19th-century Qajar era, the classical melody types were developed, alongside the introduction of modern technologies and principles from the West. Mirza Abdollah, a prominent tar and setar master and one of the most respected musicians of the court of the late Qajar period, is considered a major influence on the teaching of classical Iranian music in Iran's contemporary conservatories and universities. Radif, the repertoire that he developed in the 19th century, is the oldest documented version of the seven dastgah system, and is regarded as a rearrangement of the older 12 maqam system. During the late Qajar and the early Pahlavi eras, numerous musical compositions were produced within the parameters of classical Iranian modes, and many involved western musical harmonies.

The introduction and popularity of western musical influences in the early contemporary era was criticized by traditionalists, who felt that traditional music was becoming endangered. It was prior to the 1950s that Iran's music industry was dominated by classical musicians. In 1968, Dariush Safvat and Nur-Ali Borumand helped form an institution called the Center for Preservation and Propagation of Iranian Music, with the help of Reza Ghotbi, director of the National Iranian Radio and Television, an act that is credited with saving traditional music in the 1970s.

The "Radif of Iranian music" was officially inscribed on the UNESCO Representative List of the Intangible Cultural Heritage of Humanity in 2009, described as "the traditional repertoire of the classical music of Iran".

== Characteristics ==
Iran's classical art music relies on both improvisation and composition, and is based on a series of modal scales and tunes including twelve Dastgahs and Avazes. Compositions can vary immensely from start to finish, usually alternating between low, contemplative pieces and athletic displays of musicianship called tahrir. The common repertoire consists of more than 200 short melodic motions (guše), which are classified into seven modes (dastgāh). Two of these modes have secondary modes branching from them that are called āvāz. This whole body is called radif, of which there are several versions, each in accordance with the teachings of a particular master (ostād).

By the end of the Safavid Empire, more complex musical movements in 10, 14, and 16 beats stopped being performed. In the early Qajar era, the rhythmic cycles (osul) were replaced by a meter based on the qazal, and the maqam system of classification was reconstructed into the radif system. Today, rhythmic pieces are performed in beats of 2 to 7, with some exceptions. The reng are always in a 6/8 time frame.

A typical Iranian classical performance consists of five parts, namely pišdarāmad ("prelude"; a composed metric piece), čahārmezrāb (a fast, metric piece with a repeated rhythmic pattern), āvāz (the improvised central piece), tasnif (a composed metric song of classical poetry), and reng (a rhythmic closing composition). A performance forms a sort of suite. Unconventionally, these parts may be varied or omitted.

Iran's classical art music is vocal based, and the vocalist plays a crucial role, as he or she decides what mood to express and which dastgah relates to that mood. In many cases, the vocalist is also responsible for choosing the lyrics. If the performance requires a singer, the singer is accompanied by at least one wind or string instrument, and at least one type of percussion. There could be an ensemble of instruments, though the primary vocalist must maintain his or her role. In some tasnif songs, the musicians may accompany the singer by singing along several verses.

The incorporation of religious texts as lyrics has largely been replaced by the works of medieval Sufi poets, especially Hafez and Rumi.

== Instruments ==
Indigenous Iranian musical instruments used in the traditional music include string instruments such as the chang (harp), qanun, santur, rud (oud, barbat), tar, dotar, setar, tanbur, and kamanche, wind instruments such as the sorna (zurna, karna), ney, and neyanban, and percussion instruments such as the tombak, kus, daf (dayere), naqare, and dohol.

Some instruments, such as the sorna, neyanban, dohol, and naqare, are usually not used in the classical repertoire, but are used in the folk music. Up until the middle of the Safavid Empire, the chang was an important part of Iranian music. It was then replaced by the qanun (zither), and later by the western piano. The tar functions as the primary string instrument in a performance. The setar is especially common among Sufi musicians. The western violin is also used, with an alternative tuning preferred by Iranian musicians. The ghaychak, that is a type of fiddle, is being re-introduced to the classical music after many years of exclusion.

== See also ==
- Iranian folk music
- Kitab al-Musiqa al-Kabir ("The Great Book of Music")
- List of Iranian musicians
- Music of Iran
- Persian musical instruments
- Rhythm in Persian music
- Zoufonoun Ensemble

=== Concepts from Persian Wikipedia ===
The following articles on the Persian Wikipedia (easily translated with a browser such as Chrome) cover informations not yet included in the English Wikipedia. It is easy to gloss over rhythm, instrument and song as having the same meanings that they have in western musical theory, when they have specific meanings in Persian musical theory.

- Reng: "Reng", is a Persian musical form, type of music for joy and dance performances, usually played in 6/8 time, a subset of "corner."
- Rhythm: "Rhythm" also called "Multiplication" consists of songs or "corners" that have a specific meter and a fixed beat pattern.
- Corner: Corner or "gūsheh" in Iranian music theory: a "row" is a collection of songs and melodies, and each of these songs is called a corner.
- Row: A "row" in the theory of Iranian music, is the arrangement of songs and melodies. Each of these songs, called a corner.
- Dastgāh: "Dastgāh" in traditional Iranian music, refers to a collection of several melodies (corners) that are in harmony with each other in steps, tunes, and intervals of notes.
- Song: "Song", here is: A special kind of musical form of song, which does not have a specific meter (in contrast to percussion songs and compositions that have a specific meter)
