= List of Kurdish musicians =

List of Kurdish musical artists and groups

This is a list of Kurdish musicians, organized by genre. Kurdish music is a diverse tradition that includes folk, classical, pop, and contemporary fusion, spanning across Kurdistan and the global Kurdish diaspora.

== Classical and Folk ==
- Ahmet Kaya
- Aram Tigran
- Ayşe Şan
- Ali Zandi
- Beytocan
- Diyar Dersim
- Erdewan Zaxoyî
- Eyaz Zaxoyî
- Ferhat Tunç
- Ghader Abdollahzadeh
- Hassan Zirak
- Kawîs Axa
- Mohammed Mamle
- Meryem Xan
- Manoochehr Sadeghi
- Mihemed Şêxo
- Saeed Farajpouri
- Sayed Ali Asghar Kurdistani
- Şivan Perwer
- Şehrîbana Kurdî
- Tahsin Taha

== Orchestral and Folk ==
- Ali Akbar Moradi
- Abbas Kamandi
- Abduhashim Ismailov
- Adnan Karim
- Ardeshir Kamkar
- Dalshad Said
- Hamid Reza Ardalan
- Hafez Nazeri
- Tara Jaff
- Kayhan Kalhor
- Seyed Ali Jaberi
- Shahriyar Jamshidi
- Shahram Nazeri
- Mojtaba Mirzadeh

== Modern Pop and Rock ==
- Ahmet Aslan
- Aynur Doğan
- Bahramji
- Ciwan Haco
- Dashni Morad
- Dilo Doxan
- Helly Luv
- Serhat Baran
- Shahram Sardar
- Kader Asaad
- Mohsen Chavoshi
- Naaz
- Zakaria Abdulla
- Qadir Dilan
- Rewşan Çeliker
- Xalîd Reşîd

== Hip Hop, Rap, and Electronic ==
- Azad
- Bero Bass
- Eko Fresh
- Haftbefehl
- KC Rebell
- Kurdo
- Tobias Rahim
- Xatar

== Musical Groups and Ensembles ==
- Agirê Jiyan – Known for patriotic and folk-rock music.
- Kardeş Türküler – A project featuring Kurdish, Turkish, and Armenian folk music.
- Koma Berxwedan – A revolutionary musical group formed in the 1980s.
- The Kamkars – Kurdish folk group.
- Mastan Ensemble – Group specializing in Persian and Kurdish classical music.

== See also ==
- Kurdish music
- Kurdish dance
- List of Kurds
