= Newroz (song) =

Single by Hesen Zîrek
- Language: Kurdish
- Written: 1948
- Recorded: 1960s
- Studio: Kurdish Radio Kermanshan, Kurdish Radio Tehran
- Genre: Folk
- Length: 3:44
- Composer: Mojtaba Mirzadeh
- Lyricist: Piramerd

"Newroz" (Kurdish: نەورۆز) is a Kurdish song performed by Hesen Zîrek. It was recorded on Kurdish Radio Tehran and Radio Kermanshan. The song is based on a poem by the Kurdish poet Piramerd. The lyrics reflect themes of Newroz, the Kurdish New Year celebrated on March 21, while also conveying notions of spring, renewal, and cultural celebration.

The repeated chorus reinforces the festive spirit associated with the holiday, while the final line makes reference to the patriotic song "Ey Reqîb", commonly sung during Newroz celebrations.

== Composition ==
The song is performed with vocal accompaniment and features traditional Kurdish instruments, including the violin and tombak. The composition were done by Mojtaba Mirzadeh, a prominent Kurdish-Iranian musician known for his contributions to Kurdish music.

== Lyrics ==
=== Original poem ===
Em řojî sallî tazeye Newroze, hatewe
Cejinêkî konî Kurde, be xoşî u be hatewe
Çend sall gûllî hîway ême pê pest bû takû par
Her xiwênî lawekan bû gûllî allî newbehar
Ew řenge sûre bû ke le asoy billindî Kurd
Mijidey beyanî bo gelî dûr u nizîk ebird
Newroz bû agirêkî wehay xiste cerigewe
Lawan be 'eşiq eçûn berew pîrî merigewe
Wa řoj hellat le bendenî berizî willatewe
Xiwênî şehîde řengî şefeq şewiq edatewe
Ta êsta řûy nedawe le tarîxî mileta
Qellixanî gûle singî kiçan bê le hellimeta
Pêy nawê bo şehîdî weten şîwen u girîn
Namirin ewane wa le dillî mileta ejîn

=== Song version ===
Kurdish

ئەم ڕۆژی ساڵی تازەیە نەورۆزە هاتەوە
جێژنێکی کۆنی کوردە و بە خۆشی بەهاتەوە
ئەم ڕۆژی ساڵی تازەیە نەورۆزە هاتەوە
جەژنێکی کۆنی کوردە بە خۆشی و بەهاتەوە

نەورۆز بوو ئاگرێکی وەهای خستە جەرگەوە
لاوان بە عەشق ئەچوون بە بەرەو پیری مەرگەوە
ئەم ڕۆژی ساڵی تازەیە نەورۆزە هاتەوە
جەژنێکی کۆنی کوردە بە خۆشی و بەهاتەوە

وا ڕۆژ هەڵات لە بەندەنی بەرزی وڵاتەوە
خوێنی لاوی کوردە شەبەق شەوق ئەداتەوە

ئەم ڕۆژی ساڵی تازەیە نەورۆزە هاتەوە
جەژنێکی کۆنی کوردە بە خۆشی و بەهاتەوە

Romanization

Em rojî sallî tazeye Newroze hatewe
Cejinêkî konî Kurde û be xoşî behatewe
Em rojî sallî tazeye Newroze hatewe
Cejinêkî konî Kurde be xoşî û behatewe

Newroz bû agrêkî wehayi xiste cergewe
Lawan be ‘eşq eçûn be berew pîrî mergewe
Em rojî sallî tazeye Newroze hatewe
Cejinêkî konî Kurde be xoşî û behatewe

Wa roj hellat le bendenî berzî wllatewe
Xwênî lawî Kurde şebeq şewq edatewe

Em rojî sallî tazeye Newroze hatewe
Cejinêkî konî Kurde be xoşî û behatewe

English

This day of the new year — Newroz has returned,
An ancient Kurdish festival, arriving with joy.
This day of the new year — Newroz has returned,
An ancient Kurdish festival, arriving with joy.

Newroz became a sacred flame upon the hearth,
The youth, in love, marched toward the edge of death.
This day of the new year — Newroz has returned,
An ancient Kurdish festival, arriving with joy.

The sun rose high from the peaks of the homeland,
The blood of Kurdish youth gave twilight its hue.

This day of the new year — Newroz has returned,
An ancient Kurdish festival, arriving with joy.
