= National symbols of the Kurds =

The national symbols of the Kurds is a list of flags, icons or cultural expressions that are emblematic, representative or otherwise characteristic of the Kurdish people.

== Flags ==
Image	Notes
	The Flag of Kurdistan is the national flag of the Kurds
	Party flag of TEV-DEM; informally represents the Autonomous Administration of North and East Syria
	Flag of the Kingdom of Kurdistan (1922–24)
	Flag of Republic of Ararat (1927–30)
	Flag of Republic of Mahabad (1946–47)

== Coats of arms ==
Coat of arms of the Kurdistan Regional Government
Coat of arms of Democratic Federal System of Northern Syria (Rojava)
Coat of arms of Republic of Mahabad (1946–47)
Coat of arms of Republic of Ararat (1927–30)

== Anthems ==
- "O Enemy" (Ey Reqîb), national anthem of the Kurdistan Regional Government.
- "O Homeland" (Ey Niştîman), by Hassan Zirak
- "We will remain Kurds" (Her Kurd Ebîn), by Ibrahim Ahmad

== Founders ==
- Selahedînê Eyûbî
- Sharaf Khan
- Sheikh Ubeydullah
- Sheikh Said
- Simko Shikak
- Mahmud Barzanji
- Ibrahim Haski
- Ihsan Nuri Pasha
- Qazi Muhammad
- Mustafa Barzani
- Jalal Talabani
- Mashouq al-Khaznawi
- Salih Muslim

== Myths ==
- Sīmir, mythological figure, found in Kurdish folklore.
- Kawa the Blacksmith, mythological figure, found in Kurdish folklore.
- Rûsem, mythological figure, found in Kurdish Shahnameh.
- Felamerz, a figure in Kurdish Shahnameh
- Sam, a figure in Kurdish Shahnameh
- Zenûn, a figure in Kurdish Shahnameh

== Poets ==
- Mela Hesenê Bateyî
- Melayê Cizîrî
- Faqi Tayran
- Ahmad Khani
- Almas Khan-e Kanoule'ei
- Khana Qubadi

== Animals ==
- Asiatic Lion (Lion of Judah/Lion of Babylon, a common Symbol in Mesopotamia)
- Eastern imperial eagle (Eagle of Saladin, aprimary national symbol)
- Shahbaz (means "royal falcon", a fabled bird in Kurdish mythology and also a religious symbol in Yarsanism)
- Chukar partridge (primary cultural symbol)
- Peafowl (religious)
- Capra (genus), a religious symbol in Yarsanism
- Van cat (regional)
- Rooster, a religious symbol in Yarsanism
- Fish, a religious symbol in Yarsanism
- Wild boar, a religious symbol in Yarsanism
- Kurdish horse, added to the National Intangible Cultural Heritage list of Iran

== Trees ==
- Oak
- Quercus cerris (Usually as unique)
- Pomegranate tree
- The Shirin and Farhad Tree, a local symbole of Kermanshah
- Palm tree, a local symbole of Qasr-e Shirin, Khanaqin and Kirkuk
- Olive tree, a symbol used in Afrin

== Books ==
- Saranjâm, Holy book of Yarsanism which contains oldest parts of Kurdish literature
- Kurdish Shahnameh
- The Book of Honor (Sharafnama)
- Ancestry of the Kurds
- Mam and Zin
- The Promise of the Black Horse

== Mountains ==
- Qandil
- Kurmênc
- Zagros
- Sinjar Mountains

== Dishes ==
- Kelane (bread)
- Dolma (Yaprax)

== Other symbols ==
- Sun
- Newroz

== See also ==
- Kurdish musical instruments
