= Kurdish classical music =

Classical music of the Kurdish people

Kurdish classical music (Kurdish: میوزیکی کلاسیکی کوردی, romanized: Mîwzîkî klasîkî Kurdî, Kurdish pronunciation: [mjuːzɪkɪ klaːsɪkɪ koːrdɪ]; or مۆسیقای کلاسیکی کوردی, Mosîqay kilasîkî Kurdî) is the traditional art music of the Kurdish people, developed across various regions of the Middle East. It is rooted in oral traditions and typically features melodic modes, poetic lyrics, and traditional instruments.

== History ==
The Kurdish classical music formed itself within the general cultural and musical traditions of the Middle East, which creates a continuity of musical practices that have historically and regionally influenced the area. Some scholars describe it as a synthesis of broader cultural elements known as "great traditions," with local practices among communities, or which they call "little traditions," through the conceptual lens offered by anthropologist Robert Redfield.

Kurdish music has roots in the pre-Islamic era, marked by the emergence of modal melodic structures. It later developed further under various Islamic empires, incorporating diverse external influences.

== Instrumentation ==
Kurdish classical music features a range of traditional instruments that shape its distinctive sound. Common instruments include the Daf, a frame drum used for complex rhythmic patterns; Dumbek (tambourine), a goblet-shaped hand drum; Bağlama, a long-necked lute; and Nay, an end-blown flute; Oud, a fretless lute with a deep tone, is also used for melodic accompaniment in Kurdish classical music. These instruments often accompany vocal performances, which play a central role in the classical tradition.

== Major genres ==
Kurdish classical music includes a variety of genres that reflect the cultural and historical diversity of Kurdish communities. Major categories include folk music, religious music, and instrumental compositions, each serving distinct social and artistic functions.

=== Folk music ===
Folk music constitutes a core element of Kurdish musical expression, with common themes such as love, displacement, and social struggle. Traditional forms are preserved primarily by older generations, especially through the practice of dengbêjî, a form of unaccompanied vocal storytelling performed by dengbêjs (bards). These performances typically recount oral histories, legends, and historical events. In recent years, younger performers have introduced modern musical influences, resulting in contemporary variations of traditional folk music.

=== Religious music ===
Religious music holds a central place in the spiritual practices of certain Kurdish communities, including the Ahl-e Haqq (Yarsanism). (Note: Kurdish: ئەھلی حەق, romanized: Ehlî Ĥeq or یارسان) It is closely tied to ritual and devotional contexts and often features the tanbur, a long-necked string instrument. The repertoire includes poetic compositions known as nazms, which convey religious teachings and themes. Modern interpretations may emphasize instrumental improvisation and new compositional styles.

Religion largely contributes to the Kurdish culture and social identity. Islam is the major religion amongst Kurds, while another interaction between religious and cultural traditions is sometimes present. In many villages, religious stories have served to keep alive the Kurdish language and oral traditions.

=== Instrumental music ===
Instrumental music is another important aspect of Kurdish classical traditions. It typically involves traditional instruments such as the qanun, a type of zither, and the tanbur. These compositions may be performed independently or as accompaniment to vocal works, and they highlight both rhythmic complexity and melodic structure.

== Notable artists ==
Name	Image	Years active
Ali Merdan		1920s–1981
Mihemed Şêxo		1960s–1987
Hesen Zîrek		1940s–1972
Ayşe Şan		1956–1996
Mazhar Khaleqi		1950s–1987
Mohammad Mamle		1950s–1990s
Shahram Nazeri		1958–present
Nasser Razazi		1976–present
Merziye Feriqi		1994–2005
Qadir Dilan		1950–1999
Aram Tigran		1953–2009
Ciwan Haco		1970–present
Adnan Karim		1979–present
Karapetê Xaço		1930s–1990s
Mihemmed Arif Cizîrî		1940s–1980s
Şakiro		1960s–1990s

== See also ==
- The Kamkars
