= Nalishkêne =

Mountain in Iran

Nalişkêne (ناڵشکێنه‌) is the nearest mountain to the city of Bukan in West Azarbaijan Province of Iran.

It is in the Zagros Mountains range.

== History ==
It has a symbolic importance in Kurdish literature. Graves of two Kurdish musicians, Hesen Zîrek and Qale Mere, are on this mountain.
