= Kurdish anthems =

Songs symbolizing Kurdish identity and resistance

Kurdish anthems (Kurdish: سروودە کوردییەکان, romanized: Sirûde Kurdîyekan, or سروودە نیشتمانییەکان) are an important form of cultural and political expression that reflect the identity and historical experiences of the Kurdish people. Often centered on themes such as resilience, resistance, and cultural pride, these anthems have played a key role in preserving Kurdish heritage and voicing aspirations for independence.

The most well-known anthem, Ey Reqîb, was written by poet Dildar in 1938 during his imprisonment, it is now the national anthem of the Kurdish people and the official anthem of the Kurdistan Region.

== Background ==
Kurdish anthems play a key role in expressing Kurdish national identity and cultural heritage. Blending musical elements with ideological themes, they serve as tools for political expression and solidarity among Kurds in Turkey (Turkish Kurdistan), Iraq (Iraqi Kurdistan), Syria (Syrian Kurdistan), and Iran (Iranian Kurdistan).

The origins of Kurdish anthems date back to early Kurdish nationalism during the Ottoman Empire. Following its partition, Kurdish regions were divided among new nation-states, resulting in cultural marginalization. In response, traditional music revived a sense of identity and continuity amid modern challenges and repression. Kurdish anthems often respond to the persecution of Kurds, expressing their struggles. In recent years, musicians have also emerged as activists and cultural leaders.

== Notable Kurdish anthems ==
=== Ey Reqib ===
"Ey Reqîb" (Kurdish: ئەی ڕەقیب, lit. 'O Enemy!'), serves as the Kurdish national anthem and the official anthem of the Kurdistan Region. Composed by the poet Dildar in 1938 while imprisoned. This anthem was initially adopted by the short-lived Kurdish Republic of Mahabad in 1946 and gained prominence in the Kurdistan Region after the Gulf War in 1991, when the Kurdish population was granted greater autonomy in Iraq.

=== Her Kurd Ebîn ===
"Her Kurd Ebîn" (Kurdish: ھەر کورد ئەبین, romanized: Her Kurd Ebîn, lit. 'We will remain Kurds'), another Kurdish anthem was written by Ibrahim Ahmad, a Kurdish writer and politician, and was adopted as a national anthem in 2003. It is performed at official events in the Kurdistan Region.

== Musical characteristics ==
=== Instrumentation ===
Kurdish music employs a rich array of traditional instruments that play an essential role in its cultural expression. Prominent among these are tanbur and daf. Other important instruments include zurna and blwêr, which is widely utilized in various musical contexts. Each of these instruments contributes unique sounds that enhance the emotive quality of Kurdish music.

=== Vocal traditions ===
Vocal performance is central to Kurdish music, often characterized by its storytelling nature. The Dengbêj, traditional bards, play a significant role in this context, recounting local histories and ancestral tales through song. Kurdish songs, referred to as stran or goranî, generally feature simple melodies with a limited range of four to five notes, emphasizing lyrical themes of love, exile, and resistance. The human voice is considered the most vital instrument in this tradition, reflecting the deep emotional connection to the lyrics.

== List of Kurdish anthems ==
Kurdish title (Romanization)	English title	Author
Ey Reqîb	O Enemy	Dildar
Her Kurd Ebîn	We will remain Kurds	Ibrahim Ahmad
Yan Kurdistan Yan Neman	Either Kurdistan or Die	
Be Kurdayetî	With Kurdism	
Slawî Germî	Warm Greeting	Merziye Feriqi
Kîne Em?	Who Are We?	Şivan Perwer
Herne Pêş	Keep Moving Forward	Şivan Perwer
Lêre Nařom	I Will Not Leave Here	
Ey Kurdîne	O Kurds	
Rêy Xebatiman	The Path of Our Struggle	Shaswar Jalal Said
Kurdistan Nîştimanî Kurd	Kurdistan, Homeland of Kurds	Mustafa Dadar
Kurdistan Cêgamî	Kurdistan, My Place	Mustafa Dadar
Şînî Hêmin	The Whine of Hemin	Mustafa Dadar
Kurdistan Nîştimanî Ciwan	Kurdistan, Homeland of Beauty	
Ey Nîştiman	O Homeland	Hassan Zirak
Ey Weten	O Nation	Hassan Zirak
Kurdistan Ey Nîştimanim	Kurdistan, O My Nation	
Demî Řapeřîn	Time of Uprising	
Asûdebin	Be in Peace	
Le Řêy Kurdistan (Be Kûrdîkewe)	On the Road to Kurdistan	
Mîletê Kurdî	Kurdish Nation	Ali Baran
Kazacok (Kurdish version)	Kazachok	Ciwan Haco
Min Pêşmergey Kurdistanim	I Am a Peshmerga of Kurdistan	Nasser Razazi
Sedey Bîsteme	Twentieth century	Nasser Razazi
Kurdim Emin	I Am Kurdish	Hemin Mukriyani
