= Kurdish musical instruments =

Traditional instruments of Kurdish music

Kurdish musical instruments (Kurdish: ئامێرە میوزیکییە کوردییەکان, romanized: Amêre mîwzîkiye Kurdiyekan) are traditional instruments used in the music of the Kurdish people, in Kurdistan, which spans parts of modern-day Turkey, Iraq, Iran, Syria, and Armenia. These instruments are integral to Kurdish cultural expression and are commonly used in folk music and ceremonial performances. The musical tradition features a variety of wind, string, and percussion instruments, many of which are unique to the region or adapted from neighboring cultures. Kurdish instruments often accompany dance, poetry, and storytelling, reflecting the oral and musical heritage of the Kurdish people.

Among the most prominent Kurdish musical instruments are the tembûr, kemenche, and daf, which are commonly played during cultural celebrations such as Newroz, weddings, and other traditional gatherings.

The geography of Kurdistan influences the variety of musical instruments and styles, with different regions and communities maintaining distinct traditions that reflect their local environments. For example, music from mountainous areas often features specific rhythms and storytelling elements, while melodies from the plains tend to be smoother.

== Religious use ==
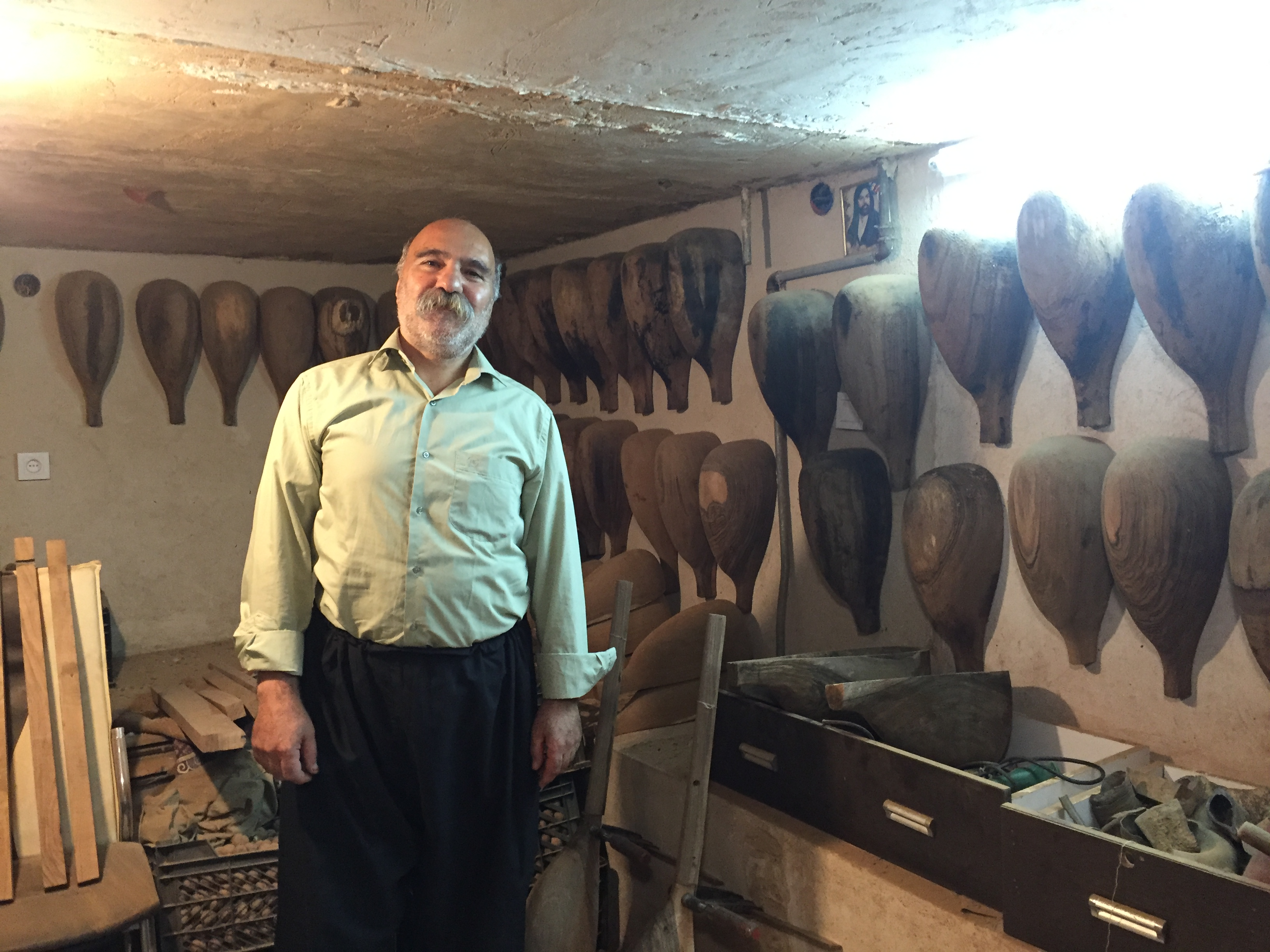
Kurdish tanbûr maker, Kerend-e Gharb, Kermanshah province, Iranian Kurdistan

The tanbûr is used in the spiritual and religious practices of some Kurdish communities, particularly within Yarsanism. In Yarsan ceremonies, it functions as the main melodic instrument during zikr (ritual remembrance), where it is regarded by practitioners as having sacred associations. It is believed to convey spiritual meaning and is sometimes interpreted as a medium for divine communication or the metaphysical concept of creation.

The instrument is also associated with Kurdish folklore and the mountainous regions of Kurdistan. During the period of Shah Khoshin, the tanbur held a notable place in Yarsan religious expression, serving both ritual and cultural functions.

== Types of Kurdish musical instruments ==
=== String Instruments ===
Name in English	Name in Kurdish	Description	Picture
Tanbur	Tembûr\Tenbûr تەمبوور/تەنبوور	A long-necked lute used widely in Kurdish music, known for its deep, resonant sound.	
Kamancheh	Kemançe کەمانچە	A bowed string instrument similar to a fiddle, played vertically.	
Oud .	'Oûd عوود	A pear-shaped, fretless lute common in Middle Eastern music, with a rich tonal range.	
Santoor	Sentûr سەنتوور	A hammered dulcimer with multiple strings, played with small mallets.	
Buzuq	Buzûq بوزووق	A long-necked fretted lute with a bright and sharp tone.	
Rebab	Řebabe ڕەبابە	A traditional bowed string instrument with a small body, common in Kurdish and Middle Eastern music.	
Tar	Tar تار	A double-bowl long-necked lute with a skin-covered resonator; It is known for its deep, rich tone.	
Qanun	Qanûn قانوون	A trapezoidal zither with many strings, plucked to produce intricate melodies.	
Bağlama	Saz ساز	A long-necked stringed lute used widely in Kurdish and Middle Eastern music, known for its bright and resonant sound.	
Dutar	Dûtar دووتار	A long-necked two-stringed lute with a pear-shaped body, typically plucked by fingers. It produces a soft, melodic tone and is used in various traditional music styles.	
Setar	Sêtar سێتار	A delicate, long-necked lute with four metal strings, played with the fingernail.	

=== Wind Instruments ===
Name in English	Name in Kurdish	Description	Picture
Zurna	Zûřna زووڕنا	A loud double-reed wind instrument, often played at celebrations.	
Flute (Shepherd's flute)	Bilwêr بلوێر (Note: Or شمشاڵ (Şimşall, Shimshal))	A small wooden flute with a sweet, melodic tone.	
Balaban	Balleban باڵەبان	A cylindrical double-reed wind instrument with a soft, mournful tone. It is often played in folk ensembles and ceremonies.	
Ney	Ney نەی (Note: Or دووزەلە (Dûzele))	An end-blown flute made of hollow reed. It produces a breathy, spiritual tone and is associated with classical and mystic traditions.	

=== Percussion Instruments ===
Name in English	Name in Kurdish	Description	Picture
Davul	Deholl دەھۆڵ	A large cylindrical drum played with sticks or hands, producing deep sounds.	
Daf	Def دەف	A large frame drum with metal rings, used in spiritual and folk music.	
Goblet drum and Tombak	Dûmbek دومبەک	A goblet-shaped drum played with fingers and palms, common in Kurdish music.	
Nagara	Neqare نەقارە	A kettle drum producing strong rhythmic beats, often used in folk ensembles.	

== See also ==
- Ziryab
- Mojtaba Mirzadeh
- Middle Eastern music
- National symbols of the Kurds
- List of musical instruments
