= Ali Merdan =

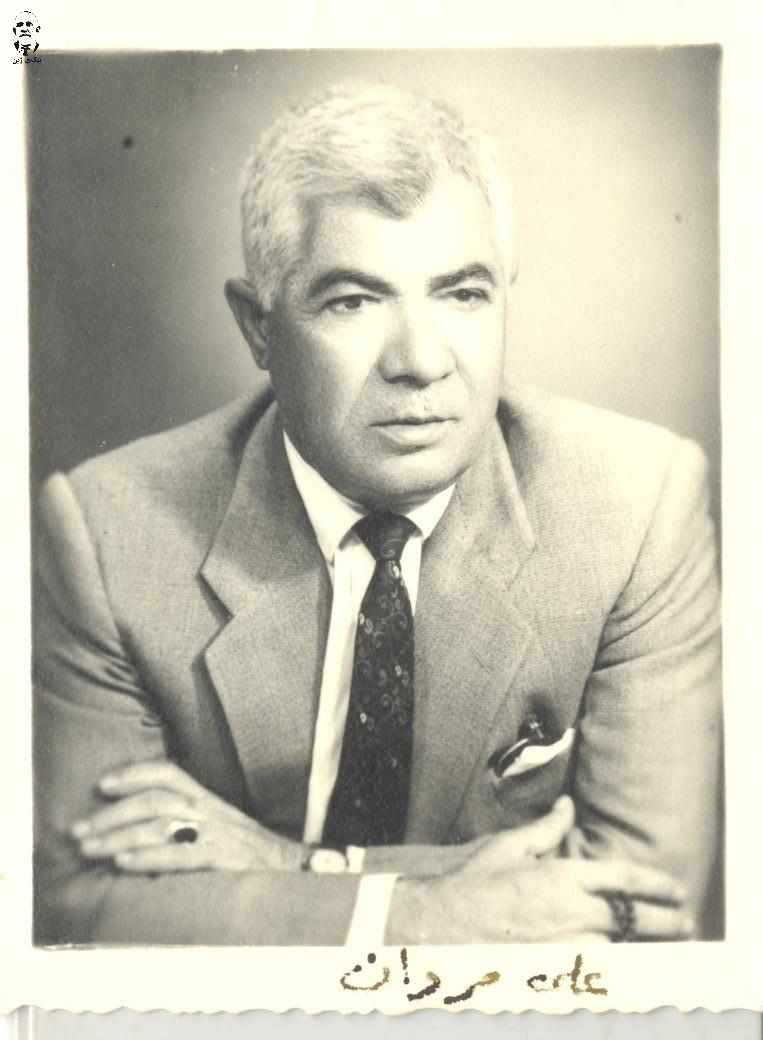

Background information
- Born: 1904; Kirkuk, Iraq
- Origin: Iraqi
- Died: July 24, 1981 (aged 77) Baghdad, Iraq
- Genres: Classical Kurdish
- Years active: ?–1981

Ali Merdan (Kurdish: عه‌لی مه‌ردان; 1904–1981) was an Iraqi musician of Kurdish descent who was born in Kirkuk. He widely regarded as the man who revolutionized the maqam. Ali Mardan launched the Kurdish Radio Station in 1939 in Baghdad.

== Childhood ==
At the age of six, Ali's father died therefore many responsibilities fell on his shoulder like supporting his family and at the same time to finish his studies.

== Career ==
During his half a century career, according to relatives and close friends, he sang more than 1000 songs, but not all of them have been recorded due to a lack of recording equipment in his early days. Ali merdan was the inspirational artist and inspired the golden generation of Kurdish Singers such as Muhamad Salih Dilan, Mamle, Hesen Zirek, Tahir Tewfiq, and Ahmad Shamal.

== Death ==
On July 24, 1981, Ali Merdan died at the age of 77.

== See also ==
- Music of Iraq
- Kurdish music
