= Sayed Ali Asghar Kurdistani =

Iranian singer (1882–1936)

Sayed Ali Asghar Kurdistani (Persian: سید علی‌اصغر کردستانی, Kurdish: سەید عەلی ئەسغەر کوردستانی/Seyid Elî Esxer Kurdistanî; 1882–1936) was a Kurdish singer and musician. He is one of the first Kurdish singers to have his voice recorded. Most of the Kurds and Iranians, especially the Kurdish regions, know him with his unique voice as one of the unforgettable singers in the history of Kurdish and Persian music. People knew him for his voice, the strength of his voice and the specific writings of his musical style. One of the memorable works is "Xamgin W Dl Pashewm". This song was recorded almost a hundred years ago. He was living in the Kurdistan region of Iran, his remaining family known as Babashahabi. His eldest grandson was Seyyed Ibrahim Babashahabi in Sanandaj.

== Life ==
Sayed Ali-Asghar Kurdistani was born in a famous religious family in 1881 in Salavat-Abad (Selwat awa), a village belonging to Sanandaj (Sine). The father of Sayed Ali-Asghar, who was a famous religious man, brought him to the class of Sheikh Abd ol-Mo'men, so that he would be able to read and sing the Quran correctly. Kurdistani spent several years learning to sing the Quran by Sheikh Abd ol-Mo'men and became an unprecedented Quran singer, so that his reputation reached over the borders resulting in his being invited to Egypt. Before 1905, he was married to Mahsharaf Khanum and the fruit of this marriage was three sons named Seyyed Abdulahed, Seyed Masih and Seyed Ali Ashraf and two daughters named Zahra and Sharaft. Kurdistani was just over 40 years old when he was invited by one of his admirers, Mirza Ebrahim Khan, who requested him to come to Tehran. Khan brought him to a ceremony where one of the singers present was Qamar-ol-Moluk Vaziri, who was the most outstanding female singer of her time.

After Qamar finished her singing, Kurdistani was introduced by Mirza Ebrahim Khan to the attendees and was requested to sing. The accompanists put their instruments aside, as they did not know him. Kurdistani sang one note higher than the pitch of Qamar's voice, much to the surprise of all the attendees, especially the present musicians, since such a pitch from a male singer seemed unimaginable. After the end of the ceremony some of the attendees and present musicians insisted on Kurdistani staying in Tehran. Through Khan's financial support, Kurdistani remained one month in Tehran and recorded nearly 30 songs for the Polyphon recording company. After that he returned to Sanandaj. It is not known who accompanied Kurdistani on these records, but the style of tar and violin playing is very near to Morteza Khan's and his brother Musa Khan's style. The records were not protected carefully; therefore only 13 records survived. Kurdistani devised his own style of Kurdish music.

== Singing style ==
Sayed Ali-Asghar Kurdistani established a unique singing style that is distinct from the Persian radif/dastgah that singers like Shajarian uses with the classical "tahrir". The Kurdish style developed is identical throughout Kurdish dengbêj and maqam singers throughout Kurdistan and shared by various Kurdish regions.

The style recognized in Kurdistani's songs is a cadence grammar where cadences tend to settle downward in the lower "qarâr" (resting) area using maqam closing (qafl) gestures that feel like a dip. Ornament is often broader melisma/portamento rather than a last-moment tahrir flick. So one hears falling-phrase ends more consistently in Kurdistani's (and in general Kurdish singers) style. The practices by Kurdish singers is a cadence closing, qafla, but the practice varies by school.

Kurdistani demonstrates a cadential formula with a return to qarâr where many lines close low so the last syllable falls. Considered in daily words as a "dip". Comparing to the Persian canonical "forud" which descents to the mode finalis; singers like Shajarian often decorate just before landing with an up-jumping tahrir (i.e a rise).

Register planning of Kurdistani and other Kurdish singers are adhering to returning to the base register at line ends; even when there is a high climax, the closure most often relaxes downward. In contrast the Persian avaz builds to climax (owj) high in the register then uses a forud to come home; if the singer pauses right after an up-tilt tahrir it can feel unresolved upward.

A last second cadence up-flip is less common at the cadence in Kurdistani's style which characterizes Kurdish singing in general (e.g Adnan Karim). Ornament habits lean more to melisma and slides.

== Works ==
A few songs remain from Kurdistani that were likely recorded in Tehran or Sanandaj. They are either based on folklore Kurdish or classic Kurdish Iranian music. He used the poems of well-known Kurdish poets such as Tahir Bag and Wafayi. These few songs have been recreated and sung by many well-known Kurdish musicians including The Kamkars.
