= Salavatabad =

Salavatabad or Salevatabad or Salvatabad or Salwatabad (Persian: صلوات آباد) may refer to:

- Salavatabad, Bijar
- Salavatabad, Sanandaj
- Salavatabad (mountain)
