= Mount Taragha =

Mountain in West Azerbaijan province, Iran

Mount Taragha, Taraxa, Terexe, ته‌ره‌غه‌

Geography
- Location: West Azerbaijan province, Iran
- Parent range: Zagros Mountains

Mount Taragha (Terexe, ته‌ره‌غه‌) is a mountain of the Zagros Mountains range, located in the Iranian Kurdistan region and northwestern Iran.

It is 20 kilometres (12 mi) from the city of Bukan, near the village of Nobar, in West Azerbaijan province.
