= Adnan Dilbrin =

Syrian Kurdish singer (1956–1999)

Adnan Dilbrîn
- عدنان دلبرين
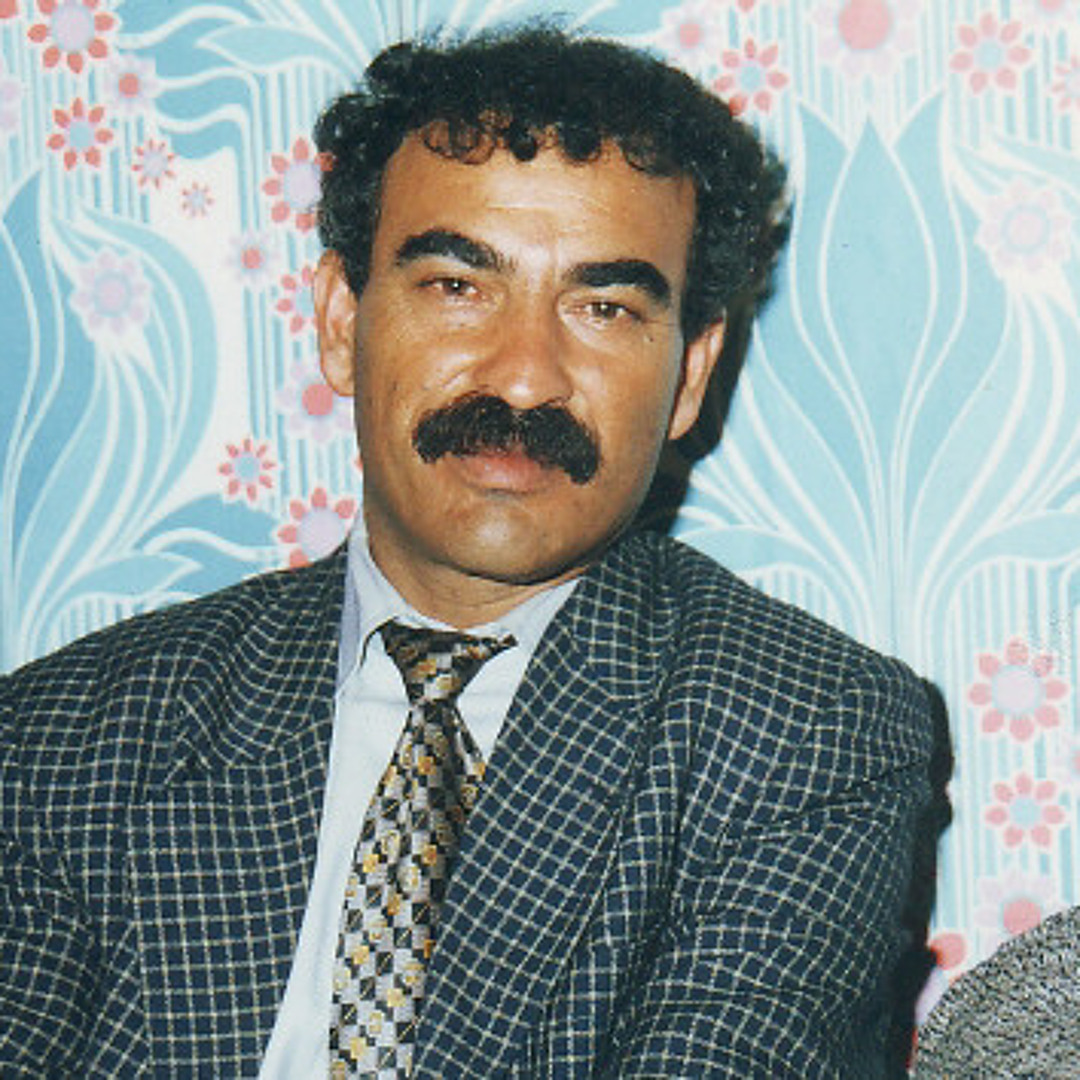
- Born: Ednan Dilbirîn; 1956; Dersiwan, Shara, Afrin, Syria
- Died: November 4, 1999 (aged 42–43); Near Aleppo, Syria
- Occupations: Singer, songwriter
- Years active: 1970s–1999

Adnan Dilbrin (1956 – 4 November 1999) was a Kurdish singer from the Afrin region of Syria. He was known for his emotional voice and popular Kurmanji folk songs, particularly among Kurds in northern Syria.

== Biography ==
Dilbrin was born in 1956 in the village of Dersiwan (Dêrsiwan), in the Shara subdistrict of Afrin. He gained popularity in the 1980s and 1990s for performing at weddings and parties across the Afrin region. His songs often celebrated love, nature, and local identity.

Adnan Dilbirin is regarded as one of the prominent artistic figures from the Afrin region and Syrian Kurdistan. His voice, artistic style, and cultural influence have left a significant mark on Kurdish music and art. He is often considered comparable in influence to renowned artists from “Çiyayê Kurmênc” (Kurd Mountain), including Jamil Horo, Salah, and Muhammad Ali Tijo.

He died on 4 November 1999 at the age of 43 in a traffic accident while returning from a wedding performance.

== Legacy ==
His music continues to be widely listened to and shared among the Kurdish community. Several albums and many of his songs remain available on platforms such as Spotify and YouTube.
