= Piramerd =

Kurdish poet and writer

Pîremêrd
- پیرەمێرد
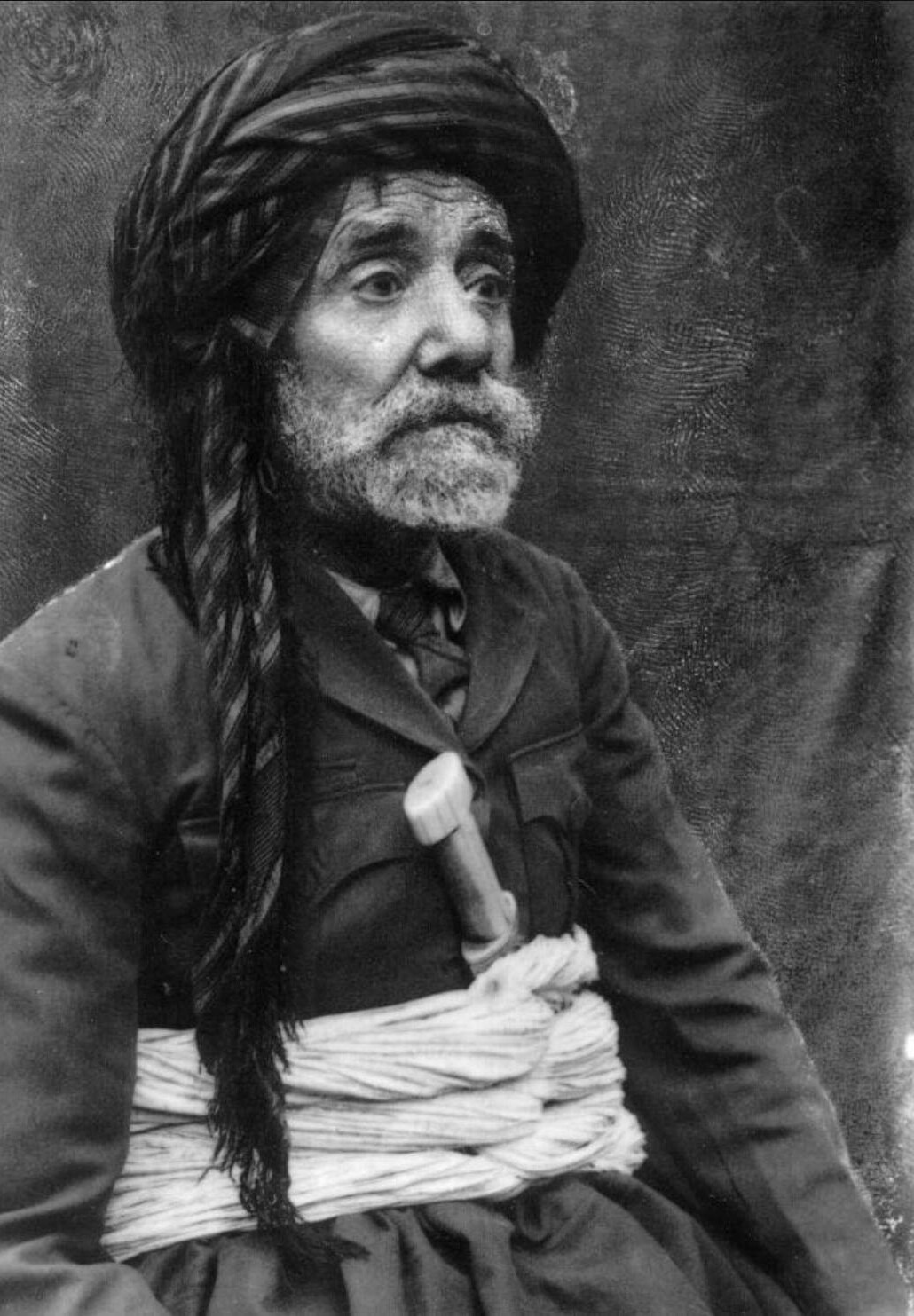
- Born: Tawfeq Mahmoud Hamza; 1867; Sulaymaniyah, Ottoman Empire
- Died: 19 June 1950 (aged 83); Sulaymaniyah, Kingdom of Iraq
- Resting place: Mameyare Hill in Sulaymaniyah
- Occupations: Poet, writer, journalist
- Known for: Jîn Newspaper, Nawroz poem (look: Newroz as celebrated by Kurds)

Tawfeq Mahmoud Hamza known as Piramerd (Kurdish: پیرەمێرد, romanized: Pîremêrd) (1867 – 19 June 1950) was a Kurdish poet, writer, novelist and journalist. He was born in the Goija neighborhood of Sulaymaniyah, Kurdistan Region. In 1926, he became the editor of the Kurdish newspaper Jîyan. He also established a private Kurdish school in Kurdistan, called Pertûkxaney Zanistî (Scientific School).

== Life ==
Tawfeq Mahmoud Hamza was born in the Goyje neighborhood of Sulaymaniyah, Ottoman Empire in 1867.

He studied Arabic and Islamic Fiqh in Sulaimaniya, and Baneh in Iran. From 1882 to 1895, he worked as an employee for different local government offices in Sulaimaniya, Halabja, Sharbazher (Şarbajêr). In 1898, he was invited by the Ottoman Sultan Abd-ul-Hamid II to Istanbul where he stayed for one year. He went on Hajj pilgrimage and was given the title of Bey by the Sultan. After this, his title became Haji Tawfeq Bey. He met Wafaei, Kurdish poet, during the pilgrimage. In 1899, he was appointed as a member of the High Majlis of Istanbul. Within the same period, he was admitted to the faculty of law in Istanbul.

In 1907, he became a member of the Kurdish organization Kurd Teavun ve Terakki Cemiyeti in Istanbul and was head writer for the organisation's journal. From 1909 to 1923, he served as the governor of several districts in Turkey and Kurdistan, among them Hakkari (Kurdish: Çolemêrg), Qeremursil, Balawa, Beytüşşebap (in Şırnak Province), Gumuskoy, Adapazarı and Amasya.

He wrote poetry under the pen name of Pîremêrd (Kurdish), meaning Old-man (English).

In 1925, he returned to Sulaimaniya via Baghdad. In 1926, he became the editor of the Kurdish newspaper Jîyan and in 1932 he was promoted to the post of Manager. In 1938, he changed the name of the newspaper to Jîn, and continued publishing it until 1950. He is also credited with the establishment of the first private Kurdish school in Kurdistan called Qutabxaney Zanistî (Scientific School). He died on 19 June 1950.

== Literary works ==
- Editing and Translation of Poems of Mawlawi Kurd from Hawrami dialect to Sorani, 1935.
- The Tragedy of Mam and Zin, Play, 1935. (This book is different from the well-known work of Ahmad Khani)
- The Story of the Twelve Knights of Mariwan, 1935.
- The Story of Mahmoud Agha Shiwakal, 1942.
- Galte û Gep, A collection of Kurdish Folklore, 1947.
- Kemançejen, Translation of a novel from Turkish, 1942.
- Editing of the collection of poems of Mawlana Khalid Naqshbandi(The Kurdish sufi).
- Editing and Translation of Poems of Besarani from Hawrami dialect to Sorani.
- Articles about Kurdish history, the history of Baban principality and Jaf tribes.
- Collection of Poems
- Encamî Pîyawî Bengkêş (The fate of an addict), short story, Gelawêj Journal, 1941.
- Zoremilî Milşikanî le dûwaye (Aggression leads to defeat), short story, Gelawêj Journal, 1942.
- Felsefey Kiçe Kurdêk (The philosophy of a Kurdish girl), short story, Gelawêj Journal, 1942.
- Xiramî, Kay kon, short story, Jîyan newspaper, no.483, 1936.

== See also ==
- List of Kurdish scholars
- Newroz, a song by Hesen Zîrek featuring lyrics by Piramerd
