= Muhammad Ali Tijo =

Kurdish Singer, songwriter and dengbêj

- محمد علي تجو
- Born: 1930; Hassan Diri, Bulbul, Afrin, Syria
- Died: February 2012 (aged 81–82); Syria
- Occupations: Singer, songwriter, dengbêj
- Years active: 1940s–2012

Muhammad Ali Tijo, also known as Ali Tijo, was a prominent Kurdish folk singer and dengbêj from the Afrin region of Syria. He was widely regarded as one of the most important traditional voices of Çiyayê Kurmênc (Kurd Mountain) and a master of Kurmanji folk music.

== Biography ==
Born in 1930 in the village of Hassan Diri (Hassan Derli) in the Bulbul subdistrict of Afrin, Tijo began singing from a young age. He became famous for his powerful voice, improvisational style, and extensive repertoire of Kurdish folk songs, ballads, and epic poems. He performed traditional songs about love, nature, heroism, and social life, and was considered a living archive of Afrin Kurdish folklore.

He was one of the leading figures of Kurdish music in the Afrin region alongside artists such as Jamil Horo, Adnan Dilbrin and Bavê Salah.

== Death ==
Muhammad Ali Tijo died in February 2012. In February 2024, a cultural symposium was held in Qamishli to commemorate the 12th anniversary of his passing.

== Legacy ==
Tijo left behind a large collection of songs that continue to be played and celebrated in Kurdish communities. He is remembered as a symbol of Afrin's traditional musical heritage.
