= Şakiro =

Kurdish Dengbêj singer

Şakir Deniz, also known as Şakiro (December 25, 1936, Eleşkirt, Ağrı — June 5, 1996, İzmir), was a Kurdish Dengbêj singer.

== Life ==
The family of Şakiro, who were from the Zilan tribe, lived in the village of Qerqa near Mount Aragats in Armenia before fleeing to the village of Kela Topraqqalê in present-day Eleşkirt district of Turkey, due to the conflict between the Russian and Ottoman empires.

Şakiro was born officially in Eleşkirt in 1936 (however it is also possible that he was born in 1931) while he spent most of his youth in nearby Cemalverdî village where he was exposed to Dengbêj songs from an early age. He died in 1996 in İzmir.

He is the uncle of music artist Özcan Deniz.

== Work ==
His songs were often recorded on cassettes and distributed illegally, when the Kurdish language faced limitations in cultural expression in Turkey. He is one of the most prominent figures for Dengbêj in recent times. His and the recordings of other Dengbêjs such as Karapetê Xaço are considered a resource for the ones who also want to become Denbêj singers. He once met such an apprentice and foresaw that he will be seen as a Dengbej who sings in the Şakiro style.
