= Mojtaba Mirzadeh =

Iranian violinist

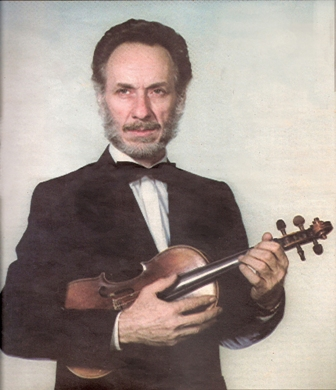
Mojtaba Mirzadeh

Mojtaba Mirzadeh (Persian: مجتبی میرزاده; March 18, 1946 – July 17, 2005) was an Iranian – Kurdish violin, kamancheh, and setar master who was influential in Persian classical music, classical and folk Kurdish music, and also in Iranian pop music.

He played, composed, and arranged music for many Kurdish and Iranian singers, including Hasan Zirak, Mazhar Khaleqi, Hayedeh, Moein, Nader Golchin, Shahram Nazeri, Shahab Jezayeri, Googoosh, Mohammad-Reza Shajarian, Dariush Eghbali, Homeyra, Golpa, Alireza Eftekhari and Reza Saqaee.

He was known in the music community as "the genius". Iranian classical and pop composer

Sadeq Nojooki says that Mirzadeh was the greatest musician he had ever seen. He was also the composer for many films.

== Biography ==
Mojtaba Mirzadeh was born on 18 March 1946 in the city of Ilam. He grew up in a poor family.

At the age of 9 he moved to Kermanshah, Iran with his family. He later moved to Tehran.

He would make sounds with pans and pots in the kitchen when he was a child. He then started to learn the santur but stopped shortly afterward.

When he was fourteen, his father offered to buy him a violin.

== Death ==
Mojtaba died from a heart attack on Sunday, 17 July 2005, aged 59.

== Filmography ==
- Nikah Halala (1971)
- Doroshkechi (1971)
- Mardi dar toofan (1972)
- Dar Emtedade Shab (1978)
- Dada (1983)

== Albums ==
Numerous tracks and albums including the following:

- Mojtaba Mirzadeh: Iranian Violin Improvising, (2007)
- Raz -e- Gol (Persian Traditional Music), (1994)
- Kurdish lullaby, composed, arranged and played by Mojtaba Mirzadeh, sung by Mazhar Khaleghi
