= Ghader Abdollahzadeh =

Kurdish traditional musician

Qale Mere قالەمەڕە
- Also known as: Qale Mere
- Born: Ghader Abdollahzadeh; October 23, 1925; Kulja, West Azarbaijan, Iran
- Died: May 21, 2009 (aged 83) Bukan, West Azarbaijan, Iran
- Genres: Classical Kurdish Music
- Instrument: Shimshal (Ney)
- Years active: ?–2009

Ghader Abdollahzadeh (23 October 1925 – 21 May 2009, Kurdish: قادر عەبدوڵڵازادە, Qadir Ebdulazade, also known as Qale Mere, Kurdish: قالەمەڕە) was an Iranian musician. Born in village of Kulij in northwestern Iran, was one of the best known Kurdish traditional musicians. He played shimshal/ney (long flute), a Kurdish traditional music instrument. He started to play shimshal (Ney) as a young and homeless man aiming to earn his daily bread. He played on the streets for an unknown number of years until he was an old man and was filmed by a journalist which was published as a documentary. He was known for the long tones he could create and to play for hours without holding breaks.

As a child, he was a shepherd and it was about this time that he accidentally started by playing shimshal. 'Qale Mere' means `wise` as a sheep, it was a name as the adults in his childhood had given him because of his calm nature. It says little about how hard his childhood was. He was born as a son of a poor shepherd, and died poor. Upon his death, he was not only loved and respected as a musician but his work reached legendary status.

== Death ==
After a long struggle with disease, he died at the age of 84 in the Iranian city of Bokan. On late Saturday May 22, 2009 his body was buried in Nalashkena grave yard beside the tomb of the great Kurdish singer Hesen Zirek.
