= Shahram Sardar =

Shahram Sardar شەهرام سەردار
- Born: January 1, 1990 (age 35); Sulaymaniyah, Iraq
- Genres: Pop; Kurdish music
- Years active: 2012-present
- Website: Official website

Shahram Sardar (Kurdish: شەهرام سەردار: born January 1, 1990) is a Kurdish singer from Iraq. He is known for his independent style in Kurdish melodies and music.

== Early life ==
Shahram Sardar is from Sulaymaniyah, a city in the Kurdistan Region of northern Iraq.

He attended school in Sulaymaniyah, finishing elementary school in 2001.

After secondary school, he finished the College of Science and Technology, Department of Computer Science.

Since childhood, he has had a passion for learning music and singing.

== Career ==
He began his musical career in 2012. He plays eight instruments. He published his first song "Yala Shofer" in 2012.

He is a production manager at Vino Company producing music and albums. He has published more than 12 albums for famous artists and produced more than 55 video clips.

In 2021, he published his album named Bo Daikm which contains 10 tracks.

He published his song "Berm Krdwy" in 2023.

== Discography ==
=== Singles ===
- 2012: Yala Shofer
- 2013: Mastan
- 2014: Safar
- 2015: Daxwazi
- 2017: Yadi To
- 2018: Damrm Ba be to
- 2018: Bo Toray
- 2019: Mn tom Xosh awe
- 2019: Frmesk
- 2019: Sultani Dl
- 2019: Hast
- 2020: Layli
- 2021: Dll La Sinam Darchw
- 2021: Dli Dewana
- 2022: Chand Jar Dastt Krda Mlm
- 2022: Peroza
- 2023: Berm Krdwy
