= Zakaria Abdulla =

Kurdish singer

Zakaria Abdulla زەکەریا عەبدوڵڵا
- Born: Erbil, Iraq Kurdistan Region
- Genres: Kurdish Pop
- Occupations: Singer, composer
- Instrument: Vocals
- Years active: 1997–2010
- Label: Zakaria Music Production

Zakaria Abdulla (Kurdish: Zekerîya Ebdullah, زەکەریا عەبدوڵڵا) is a Kurdish musician. He is best known for his pop music, which combines Kurdish melodies with popular regional music styles.

== Early life ==
Zakaria Abdulla (born 25 December 1976 in Erbil, Iraqi Kurdistan Region) is a Kurdish singer. He was born in the Tairawa neighborhood of Erbil city. In 1993, he relocated to Sweden, where he began his musical career, initially playing the keyboard alongside several other Kurdish singers.

== Career ==
Zakaria Abdulla launched his music career with the release of his debut album, To Hati ("You Came"), in 1998, marking a pivotal entry into the Kurdish music industry and establishing his reputation as a singer. His second album, Begerawa ("Return"), released in 2000, significantly expanded his fanbase by 2001 due to its widespread popularity.[4] Abdulla continued to build on this success with the 2002 release of Rozhgar ("Days"), an album featuring 14 songs that sold 1.5 million copies and captivated audiences through music videos broadcast on Kurdish television channels like Kurdistan TV and Kurdsat. In 2004, his album Tilinazi achieved remarkable commercial success, with three million copies sold, further solidifying his prominence in the music scene.

In 2007, Abdulla released Genci Piri ("Old Youth"), introducing a fresh approach with innovative music, techniques, and songwriting distinct from his earlier works. This album featured a notable collaboration with poet Sami Argoshi, with nine of its 12 songs adapted from Argoshi’s poems, including the title track and the music video for Gulê Du ("Two Roses"). Lyricist Shalaw Ali’s contributions also remained a consistent influence across all of Abdulla’s albums. His most recent work, Laparey Spi ("White Page"), comprises 14 songs, with all proceeds donated to support orphans and underprivileged children, particularly those affected by war. Since this release, Abdulla’s public appearances and artistic output have been limited, though he performed at a concert in 2017 during an event tied to the Kurdistan Region’s independence referendum.

== See also ==
- Kurdish music
- Kurdish people
- List of Kurdish musical artists
