= Seyed Ali Jaberi =

Seyed Ali Jaberi سیدعلی جابری
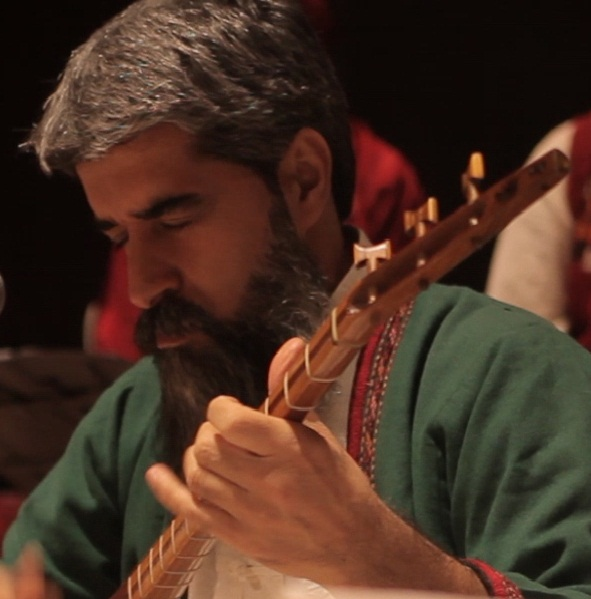

Background information
- Born: September 21, 1974 (age 52); Kermanshah, Iran
- Origin: Iranian
- Genres: Folk Music; Kurdish traditional music
- Occupations: Musician; Composer; Multi-instrumentalist
- Instruments: Tanbur; Setar; Tar
- Years active: 1989–present
- Labels: Sorush Publications; Hermes Records; Shebli Records
- Website: Official website

Seyed Ali Jaberi (Persian: سیدعلی جابری,Persian pronunciation: [sejjed æliː dʒɒːbeɾiː]; born 21 September 1974 in Kermanshah, Iran) is an Iranian multi-instrumentalist musician who lives in England. He is a maestro of the tanbur and plays Sufi music (Qawwali) in the Kurdish Sufi tradition.

He has released four albums, two of which received 4-star reviews in Songlines; Psalms of Loneliness and All Because of Love.

== Early life ==
Jaberi began learning the Tanbur at seven with Golnazar Azizi and then continued learning with Amrollah Shah Ebrahimi and Dervish Amir Hayati. He learned to play Setar under the observation of Ebrahim Sepehri and Hossein Alizadeh. Also, He learned music theory from Mohammad-Reza Lotfi and Keikhosrow Pournazeri.

Jaberi has been tanbur performing in Iran, North America, Europe, and Asia. He gained his first professional experience in Asia with the Min-on Orchestra in Japan at 20. He has also been the conductor and tanbur player in the Iranian National Orchestra.

== Awards and honors ==
- In 1994, Jaberi gained first place in playing tanbur in Fajr International Music Festival when he led The Seyed Ali Khan Ensemble.

== Festivals and Concerts ==
=== The 1990s ===
- In 1993, Jaberi performed at the Min-on Contemporary Music Festival in Japan.

=== The 2000s ===
- In 2005, Jaberi performed at International Sufi Festival India.
- In 2007, Jaberi and the Hamdel Music Ensemble were invited to participate in the International Festival of Carthage for their performances in Tunisia.
- In 2007, Jaberi and the Shams & Mowlānā Ensemble was performed in Denmark, Switzerland, and Netherlands.
- In 2008, Jaberi and the Hamdel Ensemble was performed at the Accademia Nazionale di Santa Cecilia Musical Instruments Museum, Rome.
- From February 9 to 15, 2009, Jaberi and the Hamdel Ensemble was performed in the Czech Republic and Slovakia.

=== The 2010s ===
- In 2010, Jaberi and the Hamdel Ensemble performed in Italy, Germany, and Austria which some pieces composed by Sina Sarlak and others.
- From 2015 to 2018, Jaberi has performed in 60 international concerts, including performances with Sami Yusuf and Sina Sarlak who performed alongside Jaberi and the Hamdel Ensemble at the Royal Northern College of Music in 2017.
- On February 17, 2019, Jaberi and the Hamdel Ensemble performed in Shahram Nazeri's the Language of Love concert at the Royal Northern College of Music in Manchester.
- On February 19, 2019, Jaberi, with Shahram Nazeri and other Mana Ensemble members, performed in the Language of Love project ceremony with the invitation of the University of Oxford in the United Kingdom at Holywell Music Room, Wadham College.
- June 19, 2019, Jaberi and the Hamdel Ensemble performed at Migration Matters Festival, Sheffield
- June 20, 2019, Jaberi and the Hamdel Ensemble performed at HOME, Manchester (Refugee Week)
- June 27, 2019, Jaberi and the Hamdel Ensemble performed at Bristol
- August 23, 2019, Jaberi and the Hamdel Ensemble performed at Edinburgh Festival Fringe
- September 19, 2019, Jaberi and the Hamdel Ensemble performed at Gateshead
- October 1, 2019, Jaberi and the Hamdel Ensemble performed at Symphony Hall, Birmingham

=== The 2020s ===
- June 14–21, 2020, Jaberi and the Hamdel Ensemble performed online (Refugee Week)

== Albums ==
=== Empathy ===
His first album, Hamdel, contains ten traditional soundtracks that were in symphony with playing tanbur. He played them with the master of playing daf, Ahmad Khaktinat. It was recorded on cassette tape by Sorush Publications in 1994. The international version of this album is named Empathy.

=== Psalms of Loneliness ===
The music album Psalms of Loneliness, composed by Jaberi and arranged by Meghdad Shah-Hosseini, was released by Hermes Records in 2010. This album received four out of five stars in the reviews of Songlines, a prestigious international music magazine.

=== Dawn Risers ===
The music album Dawn Risers, composed and produced by Jaberi, was released by Shebli Records in 2011.

=== All Because of Love ===
The live music album All Because of Love, composed by Jaberi, was released by Ravishing Music in 2018. Also, this album received four stars in the reviews of Songlines magazine.
