= Kurdish melodies =

Kurdish songs collection by Komitas

"Kurdish melodies" (Armenian: Քրդական եղանակներ, romanized: K'rdakan yeghanakner, lit. 'Kurdish melodies', Kurdish: Awazên Kurdî) is a collection of Kurdish folk songs collected and transcribed by Armenian composer Komitas during field work among Kurds and published in December 1903. Despite his collecting a large amount of Kurdish melodies, most of them were lost, and Kurdish melodies became the only publication of Kurdish songs by Komitas. Kurdish melodies was the first publication of Kurdish music.

== Work ==
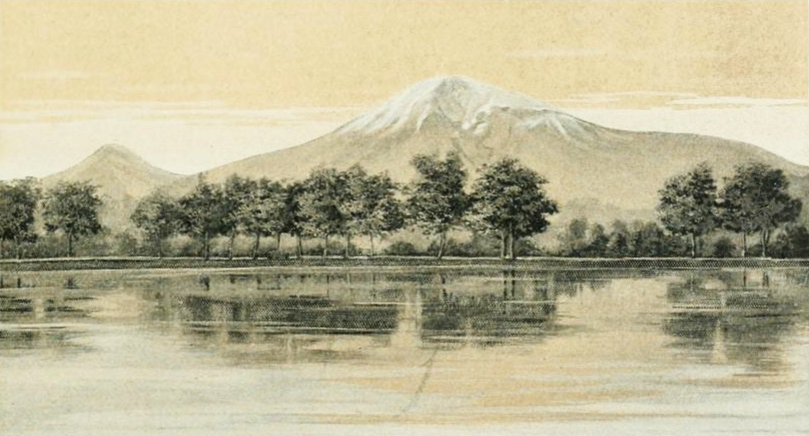
Mount Ararat, 1901 by H. F. B. Lynch

In his transcription, Komitas stayed loyal to the authentic structure of the songs and kept the unique Kurdish melodic structure. Most of the songs were epic songs. Komitas aspired to write down, preserve and make available the musical national heritage of the Kurdish people. For this, he sought to rest on authenticity. Moreover, he was keen on not collecting songs from the cities since he thought of them as corrupted and therefore spent most of his time in villages among locals. He began collecting Kurdish songs in the mid-1800s before returning to Echmiadzin in 1899.

The songs were collected around Mount Ararat.

== Songs ==
The thirteen songs that comprises Kurdish melodies:

1. Ghandili Siapusch (Armenian: Ղանդիլի Սիափուշ)
2. Lelil Medjnum (Kurdish: Leyla û Mecnûn, Armenian: Լեյլի Մէջնում)
3. Djanbalie (Armenian: Ջամբալիէ)
4. Hasan Agha (Armenian: Հասան աղա)
5. Mirza Agha (Armenian: Միրզա աղա)
6. Khullekh Giaro I (Armenian: Քուլլըք Գեարօ)
7. Khullekh Giaro II (Armenian: Քուլլըք Գեարօ)
8. Mamzin (Kurdish: Mem û Zîn, Armenian: Մամզին)
9. Darwischi Awdi (Kurdish: Dewrêşê Evdî, Armenian: Դարվիշի Աւդի)
10. Sewahadje (Armenian: Սեւահաջէ)
11. Hamede Schange (Armenian: Համըդէ Շանգե)
12. Hame Musa (Armenian: Համէ Մուսէ)
13. Sairan (Kurdish: Seyran, Armenian: Սէյրան)

== See also ==
- Aram Tigran
- Armenian–Kurdish relations
- Karapetê Xaço
- Kurdish music
