= Dashni Morad =

Dashni Morad دەشنێ موراد
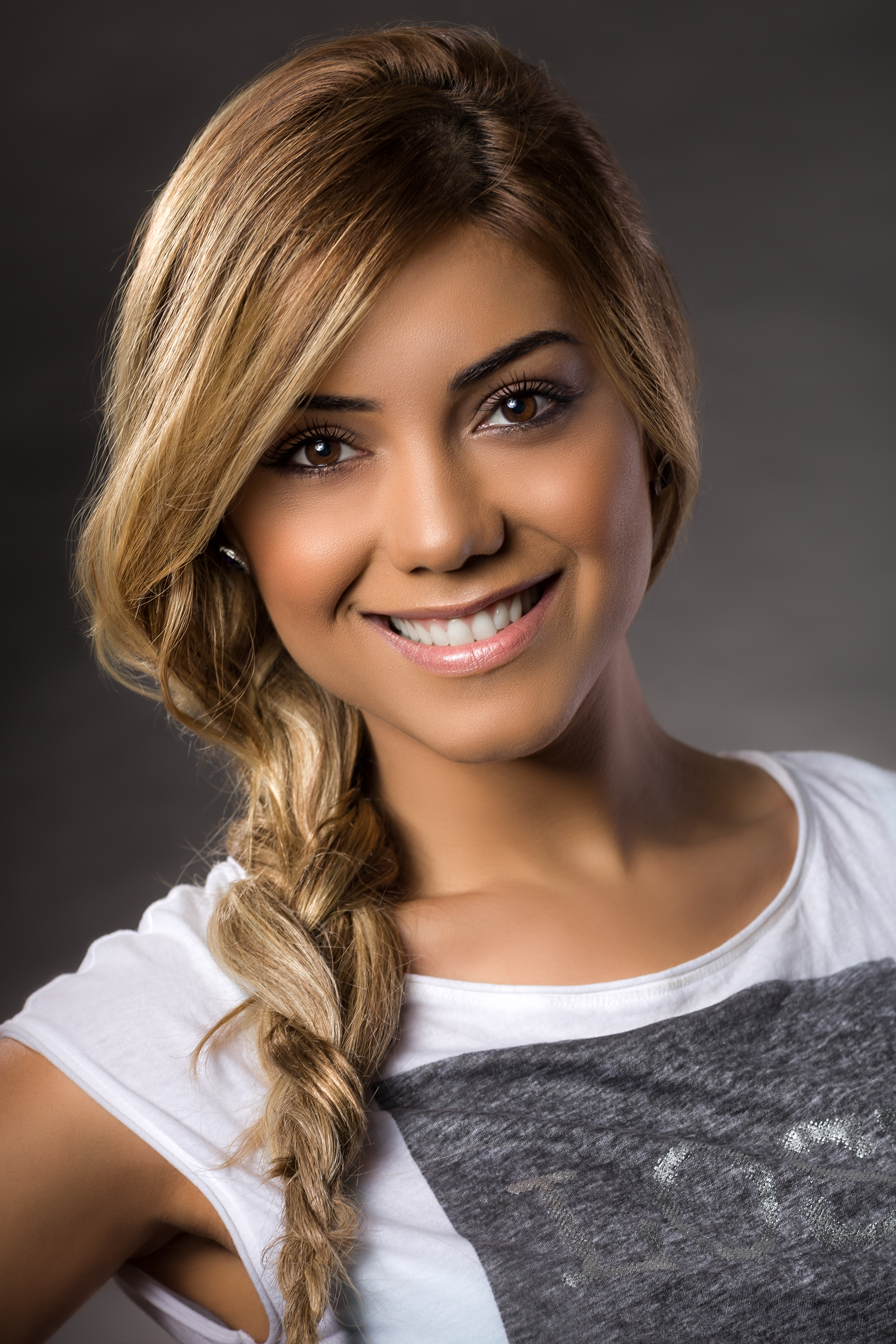
- Morad in 2005

Background information
- Born: 1 January 1986 (age 40); Iraq Sulaimaniyah, Kurdistan Region
- Origin: Kurdish
- Genre: Pop
- Occupation: Singer – Songwriter – Television Presenter – Activist
- Years active: 2006–present
- Label: Vin Production
- Website: www.dashnimorad.com

Dashni Morad (Kurdish: Deşnê Murad, Sorani Kurdish: دەشنێ موراد; born 1 January 1986) is a Kurdish singer, songwriter, television presenter, human rights & environmental activist. Born in Iraqi Kurdistan, she moved to Holland as a refugee with her family in 1997. She rose to prominence in 2005 through her television show, "Bê Kontrol", which was the first of its kind in the Kurdistan Region to explore pop culture and related aspects of contemporary Western culture candidly. Many people in the Kurdistan Region, particularly the youth, consider Dashni to have broken down cultural and traditional barriers for young women.

In 2009, Dashni began her musical career with the release of her first album, "Hela Hopa", which although successful was also controversial. Her provocative dance moves in the music video led media outlets to refer to her as the "Shakira of Kurdistan". Although many of the younger generation appreciated her music and music videos, the more conservative side of society saw them as inappropriate. Morad released two further albums, "Hom Shika Wawa" and "Frishtay Mihreban", and a series of singles, before taking time off from her musical career in 2014 to pursue her humanitarian and environmentalist projects. She founded "Green Kids" in 2012, which is a charity focused on underprivileged children, in particular refugee children, as well as the environment. Morad has been actively working to try and improve conditions at the refugee camps in the Kurdistan Region, and through campaigns has managed to donate significant money and aid. She is also a prominent campaigner for women’s rights and is seen as an inspirational feminist figure to many young women in the Kurdistan Region She was one of the first Kurdish female artists to appear as a pop singer and dancer and opened the gate for other Kurdish girl to become successful singers just like her.

== Early life ==
Morad was born on 1 January 1986 in the city of Sulaymaniyah in the Kurdistan Region of Iraq to Kurdish parents. Following the Kurdish uprising against the Ba’ath regime in 1991, 1,400,000 Kurds fled the Kurdistan Region in fear of reprisals from Saddam Hussein. Morad, then aged 5, was forced to flee to the Iranian border with her family, until it was safe to return home.

In 1997, aged 11, she moved to the city of Arnhem in the Netherlands as a refugee with her family. Whilst there, she attended St. Paulus school for two years, until she moved to the nearby town of Didam in 1999. There she attended Liemers College, where she acquired a HAVO diploma. She started modeling when she was 16 and also took up street dance. She also used to play football as a teenager, until her parents forced her to leave because of cultural reasons.

== Career ==
=== 2005-07: Rise to prominence ===
Having always wanted to work in television, in 2005, aged 19, Morad auditioned for her own show at a nearby Kurdish television station, where her concept was accepted. The show, "Bê Kontrol", was the first of its kind in the Kurdistan Region to explore Western culture candidly. Many people in the Kurdistan Region, particularly the youth, consider Morad to have broken down cultural and traditional barriers for young women. The show aired for two years on Kurdistan TV, a major Iraqi Kurdish television network, and Morad soon became a household name in the Kurdistan Region.

=== 2008-11: Music and controversy ===
Morad had always dreamt of becoming a singer and in 2008 she met a producer, Halkawt Zahir, whom she would eventually make three albums with. In 2009, she began her music career with the release of her first album, "Hela Hupa", which although successful was also controversial. The style of the album was considered as folk music with pop beats. Her provocative dance moves in the "Hela Hupa" music video led media outlets to refer to her as the "Shakira of Kurdistan". Although many of the younger generation appreciated her music and music videos, the more conservative side of society saw them as inappropriate. A number of Imams preached against her at mosques and certain more conservative television channels boycotted her music videos. At one point, she also received death threats.

Morad persisted to make music with intentionally open Western themes. In 2010, she released her second album, "Shika Wawa", which was boycotted by much of the television and media industry in the Kurdistan Region. However, the first single released from the album, "Hom Shika Wawa", was more successful abroad, receiving significant airtime on the Arab world’s leading music channel, Rotana. Fadi Haddad, the renowned Lebanese director, directed the music video for "Hom Shika Wawa". It was the first time that an Iraqi Kurdish artist had a music video aired on a major international music channel. Also in 2010, Morad presented "The Dashni Show", which was a talk show that openly discussed female issues such as romantic relationships, which is a subject that remains taboo in Kurdish society.

In 2011, she released her third album, "Frishtay Mihraban", which was a much bigger success than her second album. Later in 2011, well known for her kind-heartedness, Morad helped an Ethiopian maid, Maha, to become a singer in the Kurdistan Region.

=== 2012–14: New beginnings ===
Having left her old producer, in 2012, Morad released her first English single, "Open Your Eyes", which was not only a hit in the Kurdistan Region, but also the wider Iraq, Lebanon and Holland. In Holland, "Open Your Eyes" was number one for six weeks on FunX Radio’s XCHART. "Open Your Eyes" was produced by Gary Stevenson and written by Goran Kay. Morad was relieved that she was finally able to make the type of music that she wanted. Later that year, In solidarity with the Syrian people, Morad recorded the song "Power of Love".

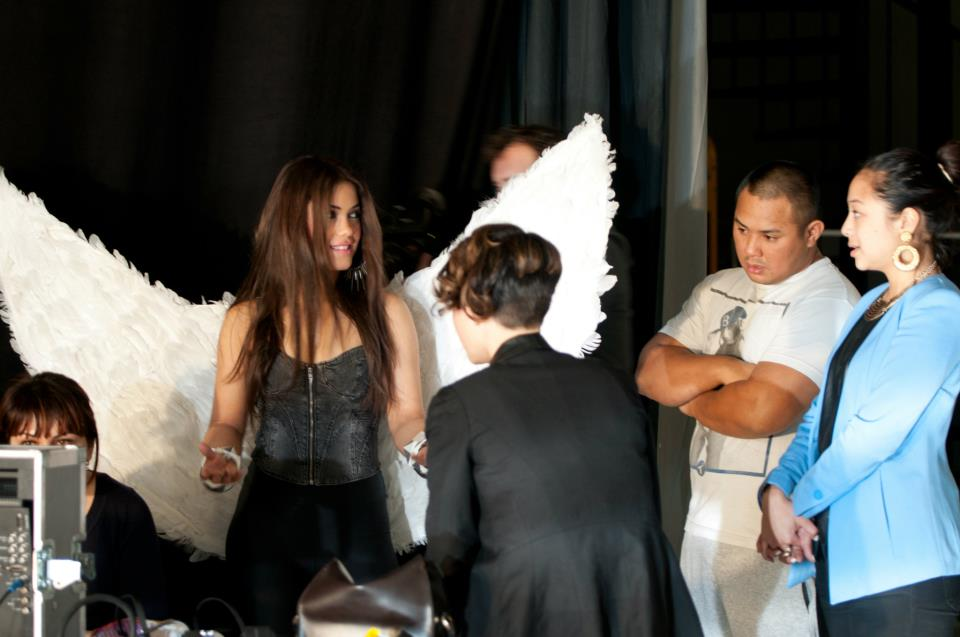
This image shows us making the music video to Open Your Eyes.

Morad also in 2012, began presenting a new talk show, "Shepolakani Jiyan", or "Waves of Life", where she focused on education, women’s rights and environmental issues.

In 2013, Morad and fellow artist Karwan Kamil were awarded a Golden Record for the Best Music Award 2013 by the Institute of Music in Duhok for their single "Binaz". Later that same year, Morad collaborated with the Kurdish musical trio Le Dinê, to release the single "Take Me Home". Also in 2013, Morad was offered a record deal by a Lebanese music label to release her album in 24 countries. However, the deal collapsed after being sabotaged by her management team.

In 2014, after further difficulties with her management team, she decided to leave them, and focus on her charity projects.

== Discography ==
- Hela Hupa (Album/2009)
- Hom Shika Wawa (Album/2010)
- Frishtay Mihreban (Album/2011)
- I Am (Open Your Eyes) (Single/2012)
- Binaz (Karwan Kamil ft. Dashni Morad) (Single/2012)
- Power of Love (Single/2013)
- Take Me Home (Le Dinê ft. Dashni Morad) (Single/2013)

== Charity work ==
Morad is a human rights and environmental activist. She founded "Green Kids" in 2012, which is a charity focused on underprivileged children, in particular refugee children, as well as the environment. Amongst other things, Green Kids provides books and learning materials to schools. To date, Green Kids has distributed over 200,000 books to underprivileged children.

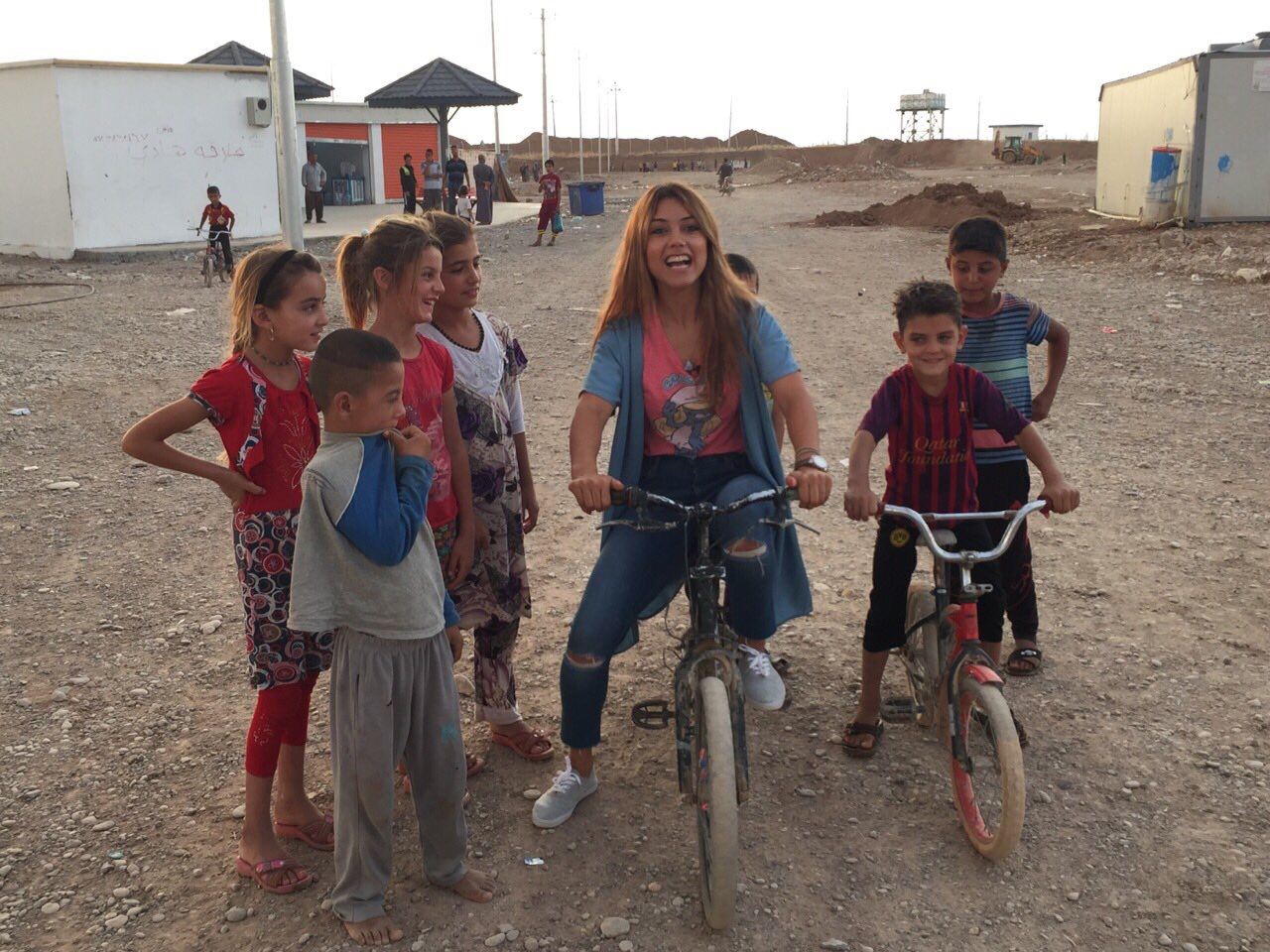
Working on Green Kids

Morad has been actively working to try and improve the conditions at the refugee camps in the Kurdistan Region. In 2013, Morad ran a region-wide campaign and raised $50,000 from public donations for the Domuz Syrian Refugee Camp in the Kurdistan Region. In September 2015, in partnership with Hoby Group Iraq and Adra Kurdistan, Green Kids opened a mini-library at the Baharka Refugee Camp near Erbil. The library provides books in English, Arabic and Kurdish. In April 2016, Morad also collected toys and books donated by school children from the Annie MG Schmidt School in Arnhem (Holland), for her second Mini Children's Library in a refugee camp in the Kurdistan Region of Iraq, which she plans to open in 2016.

Morad has been actively campaigning for and supporting captured and internally displaced Yazidis since 2014. She is currently running a campaign called "Yazidi Girls", aimed at raising money and awareness in support of Yazidis and other minorities who have suffered at the hands of the so-called Islamic State in Iraq. In 2014, Morad collected over 30 tons of aid in cooperation with Mala Ezidi Kalkar, donated by people from her local community in Arnhem, for internally displaced Yazidis in the Kurdistan Region.

Morad is also a prominent campaigner for women’s rights and is seen as an inspirational feminist figure to many young women in the Kurdistan Region. She is currently running a campaign, "Female Voices of the World", which aims to provide a platform for women to speak out and share their stories with one another, where before they were are unable.
