= Dildar (poet) =

Iraqi Kurdish poet and political activist (1918–1948)

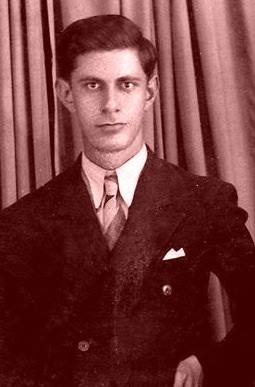
- Dildar in 1944
- Born: Yûnis Reuf or Yûnis Mele Reûf; 20 February 1918; Koy Sanjaq, Mosul Vilayet, Ottoman Empire (now Kurdistan Region)
- Died: 20 October 1948 (aged 30); Erbil, Kingdom of Iraq
- Writing career
- Notable work: Ey Reqîb
- Literary movement: Classicism

Dildar (Kurdish: دڵدار, romanized: Dildar, pronounced [dɪlˈdaːɾ]), born Yunis Reuf (Kurdish: یوونس ڕەئووف, romanized: Yûnis Mele Reûf; 20 February 1918 – 20 October 1948), was a Kurdish poet and political activist, best known for writing the Kurdish national anthem “Ey Reqîb”. The song was played in 1946 on the proclamation of the short-lived Republic of Mahabad. Today, this song is the official anthem of the Kurdistan Region.

== Early life and education ==
Dildar was born on 20 February 1918 in the Bafri Qandi Quarter of the town of Koy Sanjaq located in the Mosul Vilayet of the Ottoman Empire, in what is now the Erbil Governorate of Iraq. In his youth, he attended primary school in Ranya. He then completed his secondary education at a high school in Kirkuk. Dildar then moved to Baghdad to study law.

== Life ==
=== Literary style ===
Dildar’s first poem was published in the Ronakî magazine in 1935, while he was a secondary student and only seventeen years old.

Many of his poems were written in the classical Kurdish style, characterized by quantitative rhythm and monorhyme, a traditional form that required great skill. His poems were published in the Ronakî and Galawêz literary journals in Erbil and Baghdad. He moreover introduced romantic and realistic elements in Kurdish poetry.

=== Law ===
He graduated as a lawyer in 1945 and practiced law to defend the poor, farmers, and defending the Kurdish issues in general.

=== Political activism ===
He joined the newly formed Hîwa Party in 1938, which became "[t]he first Kurdish organisation legally recognized, that seeks a united and free Kurdistan". Dildar relocated to Iranian Kurdistan to join the revolution led by Qazi Muhammad against the government of Iran, which led to his infamous arrest in Iran.

== Prison and death ==
=== Ey Reqîb ===
After being arrested, he was sent to prison in Iran, where he wrote the poem "Ey Reqîb" meaning "Oh Enemy", in 1938, referencing the prison guards, and expressing that the Kurds were alive and will not back down from fighting for a free Kurdistan. His expression of frustration and direct confrontation with the occupiers of Kurdistan made "Ey Reqîb" a symbol in the Kurdish cause for freedom.

=== Death and legacy ===
Dildar died of heart complications at the age of 3‌0 and was buried in Koy Sanjaq, his hometown in the east of Erbil.

He lived to see his poem "Ey Reqîb" being adopted as the Kurdish national anthem. Ey Reqîb was first played and sung in 1946 on the proclamation of the short-lived Republic of Mahabad. Today the song is played as the official anthem of Kurdistan Region and widely adopted by Kurds in the four parts of Kurdistan.

== See also ==
- List of Kurdish scholars
