= Bukan =

City in West Azerbaijan province, Iran

Bukan Kurdish: بۆکان
- City
- Persian: بوکان
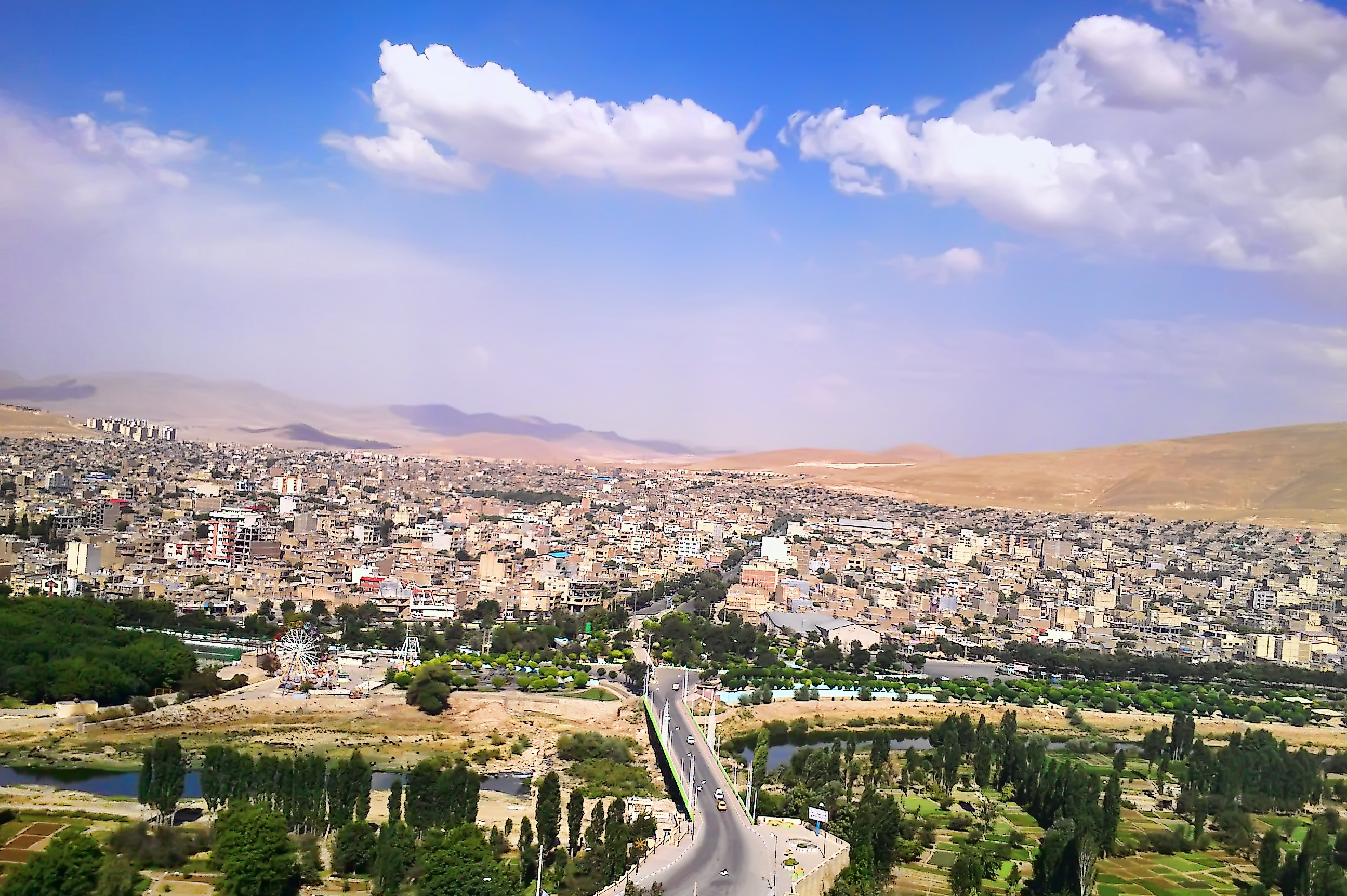

- Location within Iran
- Coordinates: 36°30′54″N 46°12′27″E
- Country: Iran
- Province: West Azerbaijan
- County: Bukan
- District: Central
- Elevation: 1,365 m (4,478 ft)

Population (2016)
  - Total: 193,501
- Time zone: UTC+3:30 (IRST)
- Area code: (+98) 44-462
- Website: www.boukan.ir

Bukan (Persian: بوکان) (Note: Also romanized as Bukân; also known as Bokan (Kurdish: بۆکان)) is a city in the Central District of Bukan County, West Azerbaijan province, Iran, serving as the capital of both the county and the district.

During the Qajar era, due to the attention and residence of Aziz Khan Mokri and his family, Bukan became important. The history of this city is related to four government figures known as Sardar Aziz Khan family. Bukan was the center of governance and their residence. After the 1979 Iranian Revolution, it flourished in social, cultural, sports, economic and political indicators. This city is one of the most important and effective cities in Iran.

== Etymology ==
Some believe that the name Bukan derives from the Kurdish word "Bûkan," meaning brides. Rashid al-Din Hamadani wrote that the name was eponymous to a Merkit prince. Only during the Qajar era is the name documented.

== History ==
=== Pre–Islamic era ===
There have been several artefacts discovered in Bukan dating back to between 4100 BC and 4400 BC. These artefacts confirm that Bukan was home to one of the first human settlements on the Iranian Plateau.

=== Islamic era ===
The city was part of the Mukriyan principality from the late 14th century to the 19th century. As the principality declined, aristocratic (agha) Dehbokri Kurds, who controlled many surrounding villages, took control over the city. The Dehbokri were staunchly against the Mukriyan principality. Despite its small size, Bukan played a major role in the region culturally and politically. In the mid-1940s, the city was incorporated into the short-lived Republic of Mahabad and acquired a printing press and Kurdish books and magazines were published. Later, the town experienced a peasant revolt wherein the peasants succeeded in forcing the aristocrats out. The revolt was ultimately put down ruthlessly by the army.

Up until the 1950s, Bukan was considered a large village but has seen a rapid growth since then. Its population increased from 5,307 in 1956, to 20,579 in 1976 and 149,340 in 2006.

The people of Bukan took part in the Iranian Revolution in 1979 and in the subsequent Kurdish movement for autonomy. It fell under the control of Kurdish opposition groups, but was recaptured by the Iranian Army on 1 January 1984. According to the Islamic Revolutionary Guard Corps, Bukan was the last Kurdish city in Iran to be captured. On 15 April 1988, Bukan was bombarded by the Iraqi Air Force, in which 19 people died and 160 were wounded.

== Demographics ==
=== Language and ethnicity ===
The whole county is populated by Shafi'i Kurds who speak Sorani Kurdish.

=== Population ===
Population history
Year	Pop.	±%
1956	5,307	—
1966	9,357	+76.3%
1976	20,579	+119.9%
1986	67,938	+230.1%
1991	83,401	+22.8%
1996	120,020	+43.9%
2006	149,340	+24.4%
2011	170,600	+14.2%
2016	193,501	+13.4%

At the time of the 2006 National Census, the city's population was 149,340 people in 32,588 households. The following census in 2011 counted 170,600 people in 43,269 households. The 2016 census measured the population of the city as 193,501 people in 56,944 households.

== Geography ==
=== Location ===
The city is situated east of the Siminarud river.

=== Mountains ===
- Nalishkêne mountain, in the Zagros Mountains range.

== Historical sites ==
=== Sardar Castle ===
In 1247 Persian Date, Sardar Aziz Khan Mokri from the Sardasht region built a castle near the great reservoir of Bukan that is presently named after its founder as Sardaar Aziz Khaan Castle. The castle was built on top of a hill 50 by 60 meters in diameter and 13 meters tall, and its main building material is 20 by 20 cm bricks with clay mortar and timbers. The castle measures 25 by 30 meters and has 6 daises which rest upon 9-storey columns 2 meters tall and 1 meter in diameter.

During 1325-1351 (A.H) the castle was turned into a police headquarters, post office, and a school respectively and finally was destroyed completely in 1361 A.H and replaced by a newly built structure that used as Basidj (Mobilization) Station.

== Sports ==
Football is the most popular sport in the city. Since 2000, Bukan has been host to the professional club Sardar Bukan F.C. which plays in the Iranian League 2 (third tier). In 2017, Sardar Bukan gained a nationwide reputation for its support from the people of Bukan.

== Notable people ==
- Sardar Aziz Khan Mokri
- Hasan Zirak
- Misbaholdiwan Adab
- Sadegh Sharafkandi
- Abdurrahman Sharafkandi
- Ghader Abdollahzadeh
- Afshin Esmaeil Ghaderzadeh

== See also ==
Media related to Bukan at Wikimedia Commons
