= Şehrîbana Kurdî =

Kurdish singer (born 1973)

Şehrîbana Kurdî (born 1973, Mazıdağı), is a Kurdish singer from Kurdistan. Her family are originally from Mazıdağı, Mardin. She began singing at the age of 14 in 1987 at local school bands, and since 1991 she has become a professional singer. Her first album was titled Ez keçim keça Kurdanim (I am a Kurdish girl). Her songs are mainly sung in Kurmanji Kurdish.

== Albums ==
1. Ez keçim keça Kurdanim, (I am a Kurdish girl), 1991.
2. Sor Gula Min, (My red rose), 1992.
3. Yek, du, sê, (One, two, three), 1993.
4. Em Hatin, (We came), 1995.
5. Evîna Stranan, (Love of songs), 2005.
