= Ey Reqîb =

Ethnic anthem of the Kurds and the Kurdistan Region

English: O Enemy!
- ئەی ڕەقیب
- Regional anthem of the Kurdistan Region Former national anthem of Mahabad
- Lyrics: Dildar, 1938
- Adopted: 1946 (by Mahabad); 1991 (by Kurdistan Region)

Audio sample
- file; help

"Ey Reqîb" (Kurdish: ئەی ڕەقیب, romanized: Ey Řeqîb, pronounced [ɛj rɛˈqiːb]) is the Kurdish national anthem and the official anthem of the semi-autonomous Kurdistan Region of Iraq. The poem was written in 1938 by Dildar in Sorani.

== History ==
It was written by the Kurdish poet and political activist, Dildar in 1938, while in jail. "Ey Reqîb" meaning "O Enemy!" refers to the jail guards in the prison where Dildar was held and tortured but also the broader oppression of Kurds.

In 1946, the poem was adopted as the national anthem of the Kurdistan Republic of Mahabad, a short-lived Kurdish republic of the 20th century in Iran that lasted for a year. "Ey Reqîb" has been adopted as the national anthem of Kurdistan Region and is also used by Kurdistan Workers' Party.

== Official lyrics ==
=== Central Kurdish (Sorani) ===
Kurdo-Arabic script

ئەی ڕەقیب، ھەر ماوە قەومی کوردزمان،
نایشکێنێ دانەری تۆپی زەمان.
کەس نەڵێ کورد مردووە، کورد زیندووە،
زیندووە، قەت نانەوێ ئاڵاکەمان.

لاوی کورد ھەستایە سەر پێ وەک دلێر،
تا بە خوێن نەخشی بکا تاجی ژیان.
کەس نەڵێ کورد مردووە، کورد زیندووە،
زیندووە، قەت نانەوێ ئاڵاکەمان.

ئێمە ڕۆڵەی میدیا و کەیخوسرەوین،
دینمان، ئایینمان، ھەر نیشتمان
کەس نەڵێ کورد مردووە، کورد زیندووە،
زیندوە، قەت نانەوێ ئاڵاکەمان.

ئێمە ڕۆڵەی ڕەنگی سوور و شۆڕشین،
سەیری کە، خوێناوییە ڕابردوومان.
کەس نەڵێ کورد مردووە، کورد زیندووە،
زیندووە، قەت نانەوێ ئاڵاکەمان.

لاوی کورد ھەر ‌حازر و ئامادەیە،
گیانفیدایە، گیانفیدا، ھەر گیانفیدا.
کەس نەڵێ کورد مردووە، کورد زیندووە،
زیندووە، قەت نانەوێ ئاڵاکەمان.

Romanization

Ey řeqîb her mawe qewmî Kurdziman,
Nayşikênê danerî topî zeman.
Kes nellê Kurd mirdiwe, Kurd zîndiwe,
Zîndiwe qet nanewê allakeman.

Ême roley rengî sûr û şorriş în,
Seyrî ke, xwênawî ye rabirdûman.
Kes nelê kurd mirduwe, kurd zînduw e,
Zînduw e, qet nanewê allakeman.

Lawî Kurd hestaye ser pê wek dilêr,
Ta be xwên nexşî bika tacî jiyan.
Kes nellê Kurd mirdiwe, Kurd zîndiwe,
Zîndiwe, qet nanewê allakeman.

Ême řolley Mîdya û Keyxusrewîn,
Dînman, ayinmian, her nîştiman.
Kes nellê Kurd mirdiwe, Kurd zîndiwe,
Zîndiwe, qet nanewê allakeman.

Lawî Kurd her ĥazir u amadeye,
Giyanfîdaye, giyanfîda, her giyanfîda.
Kes nellê Kurd mirdiwe, Kurd zîndiwe,
Zîndiwe, qet nanewê allakeman.

IPA transcription

[aj ɾaqiːb haɾ maːwa qawmiː kuɾdzamaːn]
[naːjʃkeːneː daːnaɾiː toːpiː zamaːn]
[kas naɫeː kuɾd mɾduːwa kuɾd zinduːwa]
[zinduːwa qat naːnawaː aːɫaːkamaːn]

[laːwiː kuɾd hastaːjaː saɾ peː wak dɯleːɾ]
[taː ba xweːn naxʃiː bɯkaː taːdʒiː dʒiːjaːn]
[kas naɫeː kuɾd mɾduːwa kuɾd zinduːwa]
[zinduːwa qat naːnawaː aːɫaːkamaːn]

[eːma roːɫaj miːdjaː uː kajxusɾawiːn]
[diːnmaːn aːjiːnmaːn haɾ niʃtɯmaːn]
[kas naɫeː kuɾd mɾduːwa kuɾd zinduːwa]
[zinduːwa qat naːnawaː aːɫaːkamaːn]

[eːma roːɫaj raŋgiː suːr uː ʃoːrɯʃiːn]
[sayɾiː ka xweːnaːwiːja raːbɾduːmaːn]
[kas naɫeː kuɾd mɾduːwa kuɾd zinduːwa]
[zinduːwa qat naːnawaː aːɫaːkamaːn]

[laːwiː kuɾd haɾ ħaːzɯr uː aːmaːdaːja]
[gjaːnfiːdaːja gjaːnfiːdaː haɾ gjaːnfiːdaː]
[kas naɫeː kuɾd mɾduːwa kuɾd zinduːwa]
[zinduːwa qat naːnawaː aːɫaːkamaːn]

== Lyrics in other dialects ==
=== Northern Kurdish (Kurmanci) ===
Latin script

Ey reqîb her maye qewmê kurd ziman
Naşikê û danayê bi topê zeman.
Kes nebê kurd dimirin, kurd jîn dibin.
Jîn dibin qet nakevê ala kurdan.

Em xortên rengê sor û şoreşin
Seyr bike xwîna dîyan me da rijand.
Kes nebê kurd dimirin, kurd jîn dibin.
Jîn dibin qet nakevê ala kurdan.

Em xortên Medya û Keyxusrewin
Dîn îman û ayîman, her niştiman.
Dîn îman û ayîman, kurd û Kurdistan.
Kes nebê kurd dimirin, kurd jîn dibin.
Jîn dibin qet nakevê ala kurdan.

Lawê kurd rabûye ser pê wek şêran
Ta bixwîn nexşîn bike tacî jiyan.
Kes nebê kurd dimirin, kurd jîn dibin.
Jîn dibin qet nakevê ala kurdan.

Xortên nûh tev hazir û amade ne
Can fîda ne can fîda, her can fîda.
Kes nebê kurd dimirin, kurd jîn dibin.
Jîn dibin qet nakevê ala kurdan.

Kurdo-Arabic script
ئەی ڕەقیب ھەر، مایە قەومێ کورد زمان

ناشکێ و دانایێ ب تۆپێ زەمان.
کەس نەبێ کورد دمرن، کورد ژین دبن.
ژین دبن قەت ناکەڤێ ئالا کوردان.

ئەم خۆرتێن رەنگێ سۆر و شۆرەشن
سەیر بکە خوینا دییان مە دا رژاند.
کەس نەبێ کورد دمرن، کورد ژین دبن.
ژین دبن قەت ناکەڤێ ئالا کوردان.

ئەم خۆرتێن میدیا و کەیخوسرەوین
دین ئیمان و ئاییمان، ھەر نشتیمان.
دین ئیمان و ئاییمان، کورد و کوردستان.
کەس نەبێ کورد دمرن، کورد ژین دبن.
ژین دبن قەت ناکەڤێ ئالا کوردان.

لاوێ کورد رابوویە سەر پێ وەک شێران
تا ب خوین نەخشین بکە تاجێ ژیان.
کەس نەبێ کورد دمرن، کورد ژین دبن.
ژین دبن قەت ناکەڤێ ئالا کوردان.

خۆرتێ نوح تەڤ حازر و ئامادەنە
جان فیدا نە، جان فیدا، ھەر جان فیدا.
کەس نەبێ کورد دمرن، کورد ژین دبن.

ژین دبن قەت ناکەڤێ ئالا کوردان.

=== Southern Kurdish ===
Kurdo-Arabic script
ئه‌ئێ ڕه‌قیب هه‌ر ماگه‌ قه‌وم کورد زوان،

نیه‌شکنێگه‌ئێ گه‌ردش چه‌رخ زه‌مان،
که‌س نه‌ۊشێ کورد مردگه‌، کورد زینگه‌،
زینگه‌ هه‌ر ئه‌و شه‌کێ ئاڵاگه‌مان،

ئیمه‌ ڕووڵه‌ئێ ڕه‌نگ سوور و شووڕشیم،
سه‌یرێ که‌ خۊناویه‌ وێئه‌رده‌مان،
که‌س نه‌ۊشێ کورد مردگه‌، کورد زینگه‌،
زینگه‌ هه‌ر ئه‌و شه‌کێ ئاڵاگه‌مان،

ئیمه‌ ڕووڵه‌ئێ میدیا و که‌ئێخه‌سره‌وین،
دینمان ئایینمان هه‌ر نێشتمان،
که‌س نه‌ۊشێ کورد مردگه‌، کورد زینگه‌،
زینگه‌ هه‌ر ئه‌و شه‌کێ ئاڵاگه‌مان،

ڕووڵگ کورد هه‌ڵساسه‌ پا وێنه‌ئێ دلێر،
تا وه‌ خۊن ڕه‌نگین بکه‌ئێ تاج ژیان،
که‌س نه‌ۊشێ کورد مردگه‌، کورد زینگه‌،
زینگه‌ هه‌ر ئه‌و شه‌کێ ئاڵاگه‌مان،

ڕووڵگ کورد هه‌ر حارز و ئاماده‌ئێئه‌،
گیان فه‌دائێئه‌، گیان فه‌دائێئه‌، گیان فه‌دا،
که‌س نه‌ۊشێ کورد مردگه‌، کورد زینگه‌،

زینگه‌ هه‌ر ئه‌و شه‌کێ ئاڵاگه‌مان.

=== Zazaki ===
Latin script

Ey reqîb, tim mendo qewmê kurziwan
Nêşiknen ey v'raştoxê topê zeman
Kes nêvaj kurd merde yo, kurd ganî yo
Ganî yo qet nêna war alaya ma

Lajê kurdî werişto pay sey çêran
Ke b' gonî nexşîn taca cuyan
Kes nêvaj kurd merde yo, kurd ganî yo
Ganî yo qet nêna war alaya ma

Ma leyîrê Medya û Keyxusrew î
Dînê ma yo, ayînê ma yo welat o
Kes nêvaj kurd merde yo, kurd ganî yo
Ganî yo qet nêna war alaya ma

Ma leyîrê rengê sûr û şoriş î
Bewnî, gonîdmende yo vîyartey ma
Kes nêvaj kurd merde yo, kurd ganî yo
Ganî yo qet nêna war alaya ma

Lajê kurdî hazir û amade yo
Ganfîda yo ganfîda yo, ganfîda
Kes nêvaj kurd merde yo, kurd ganî yo
Ganî yo qet nêna war alaya ma

== Translations ==
Literal translation

Oh, enemy! The Kurdish people live on,
They have not been crushed by the weapons of any time
Let no one say Kurds are dead, they are living
They live and never shall we lower our flag

We are descendants of the red banner of the revolution
Look at our past, how bloody it is
Let no one say Kurds are dead, they are living
They live and never shall we lower our flag

We are the descendants of the Medes and Cyaxares
Kurdistan is our religion, our credo,
Let no one say Kurds are dead, they are living
They live and never shall we lower our flag

The Kurdish youth rise bravely,
With their blood they colored the crown of life
Let no one say Kurds are dead, they are living
They live and never shall we lower our flag

The Kurdish youth are ready and prepared,
To give their life as the supreme sacrifice
Let no one say Kurds are dead, they are living
They live and never shall we lower our flag

Alternative translation

Oh foes who watch us, the nation whose language is Kurdish is alive
It cannot be defeated by makers of weapons of any time
Let no one say the Kurds are dead, the Kurds are alive
The Kurds are alive and their flag will never fall

We are the sons of the red colour of revolution
Our history is one filled with blood
Let no one say the Kurds are dead, the Kurds are alive
The Kurds are alive and our flag will never fall

We are the sons of the Medes and Kai Khosrow
Our homeland is our faith and religion
Let no one say the Kurds are dead, the Kurds are alive
The Kurds are alive and our flag will never fall

The Kurdish youth has risen like noble warriors
To draw the crown of life with blood
Let no one say the Kurds are dead, the Kurds are alive
The Kurds are alive and our flag will never fall

The Kurdish youth are ever-ready
And always prepared to sacrifice their lives
To sacrifice their lives, to sacrifice their lives.
Let no one say the Kurds are dead, the Kurds are alive
The Kurds are alive and our flag will never fall

== Other versions ==
Mohammed Mamle

Muhamad Salih Dilan

Qadir Dilan

Şivan Perwer

Mustafa Dadar

Official instrumental recording

== See also ==
- Kurdish anthems
