= Golpa =

Golpa گلپا
- Village
- Location within Iran
- Coordinates: 30°02′16″N 53°55′35″E
- Country: Iran
- Province: Fars
- County: Bavanat
- Bakhsh: Sarchehan
- Rural District: Sarchehan

Population (2006)
  - Total: 69
- Time zone: UTC+3:30 (IRST)
  - Summer (DST): UTC+4:30 (IRDT)

Golpa (Persian: گلپا, also Romanized as Golpā) is a village in Sarchehan Rural District, Sarchehan District, Bavanat County, Fars province, Iran. At the 2006 census, its population was 69, in 17 families.
