= Kulich, Iran =

Kulich كوليچ
- Village
- Location within Iran
- Coordinates: 35°07′58″N 46°30′23″E
- Country: Iran
- Province: Kurdistan
- County: Sarvabad
- Bakhsh: Central
- Rural District: Zherizhah

Population (2006)
  - Total: 201
- Time zone: UTC+3:30 (IRST)
  - Summer (DST): UTC+4:30 (IRDT)

Kulich (Persian: كوليچ, also Romanized as Kūlīch; also known as Kaljī, Kolīshg, Kolishk, and Kūlīj) is a village in Zherizhah Rural District, in the Central District of Sarvabad County, Kurdistan Province, Iran. At the 2006 census, its population was 201, in 41 families. The village is populated by Kurds.
