= Kurdish Shahnameh =

Collection of epic poems

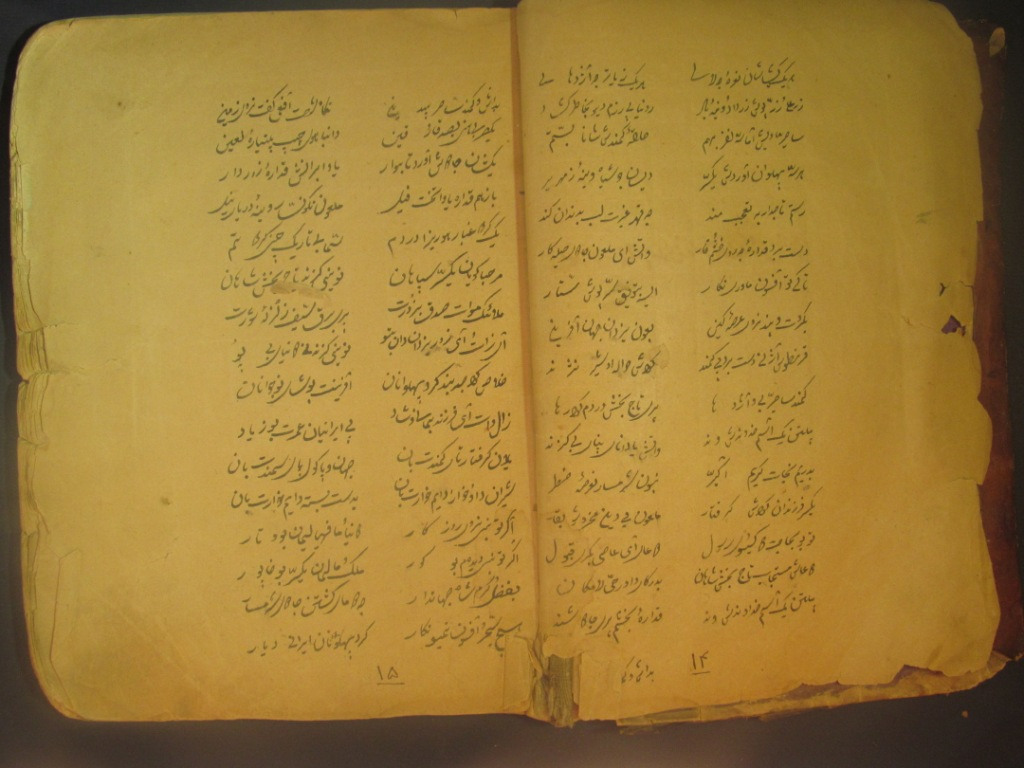
A manuscript of Kurdish Shahnameh from the archive of legacy committee of Vejin

Kurdish Shahnameh or Kurdish Shanama (Sorani Kurdish: شانامەی کوردی) is a collection of epic poems that has been passed from mouth to mouth, as part of Kurdish oral tradition.

In popular culture, the collecting and writing of the Shahnameh in Gorani is attributed to the Kurdish poet Sarhang Almas Khan in the 18th century, but in reality many writers have gathered and written down the text of Shahnameh in different locations and times. In fact, older and more recent manuscripts of the Kurdish Shahnameh are available.

There are several differences between the Kurdish Shahnameh and Ferdowsi's Shahnameh, besides the language in which they were written down. There are several characters that are not mentioned in Ferdowsi's Shahnameh. Furthermore, the meter of Kurdish Shahnama is syllabic, which is more common in the Kurdish literature. Shahram Nazeri has sung several verses of the Kurdish Shahnameh in Avaze Asatir.
