= Zilan (tribal confederation) =

Kurdish tribal confederation

The Zilan was a confederation of Kurdish nomadic tribal pastoralists, consisting of various tribes and clans hailing from the northern part of the Ottoman-Qajar frontier.

Members of the confederation, in terms of economy, being nomadic pastoralists, almost solely engaged in animal rearing. A very small part of the Zilan Confederation adjusted themselves to a more sedentary life and engaged in farming in the Aras valley. Throughout the late 18th and early 19th centuries, the Zilan Confederation's pastoral dwellings were situated in the northern parts of the Ottoman-Qajar frontier. The Zilan circulated between winter pastures and summer pastures. Numerous members of the Zilan spent the winter in Ottoman-ruled Kars and the Iranian Erivan Khanate across both sides of the Aras River. By summertime they moved to their summer pastures situated on the slopes of Mount Ararat and Sinekî in the south, and Mount Alagöz (Aragats) in the north.
