= Almas Khan-e Kanoule'ei =

Poet

Sarhang Almas Khan
- Born: 1706; Kermanshah
- Died: 1777 (aged 70–71); Kermanshah
- Occupations: Poet, officer
- Writing career
- Period: 18th century

Sarhang Almas Khan (Kurdish: ئەڵماس خانی کەنۆڵەیی, romanized: Serheng Elmas Xan), was a Kurdish poet from the village of Kenule in Kermanshah, then under the rule of the Zand dynasty. He is known for writing the Kurdish Shahnameh which until then had been passed down orally. He wrote in Gorani.

== Works ==
1. Kurdish Shahnameh
2. Gurba wa Mush, Cat and Mouse (poem)
