= Kurdish folk music =

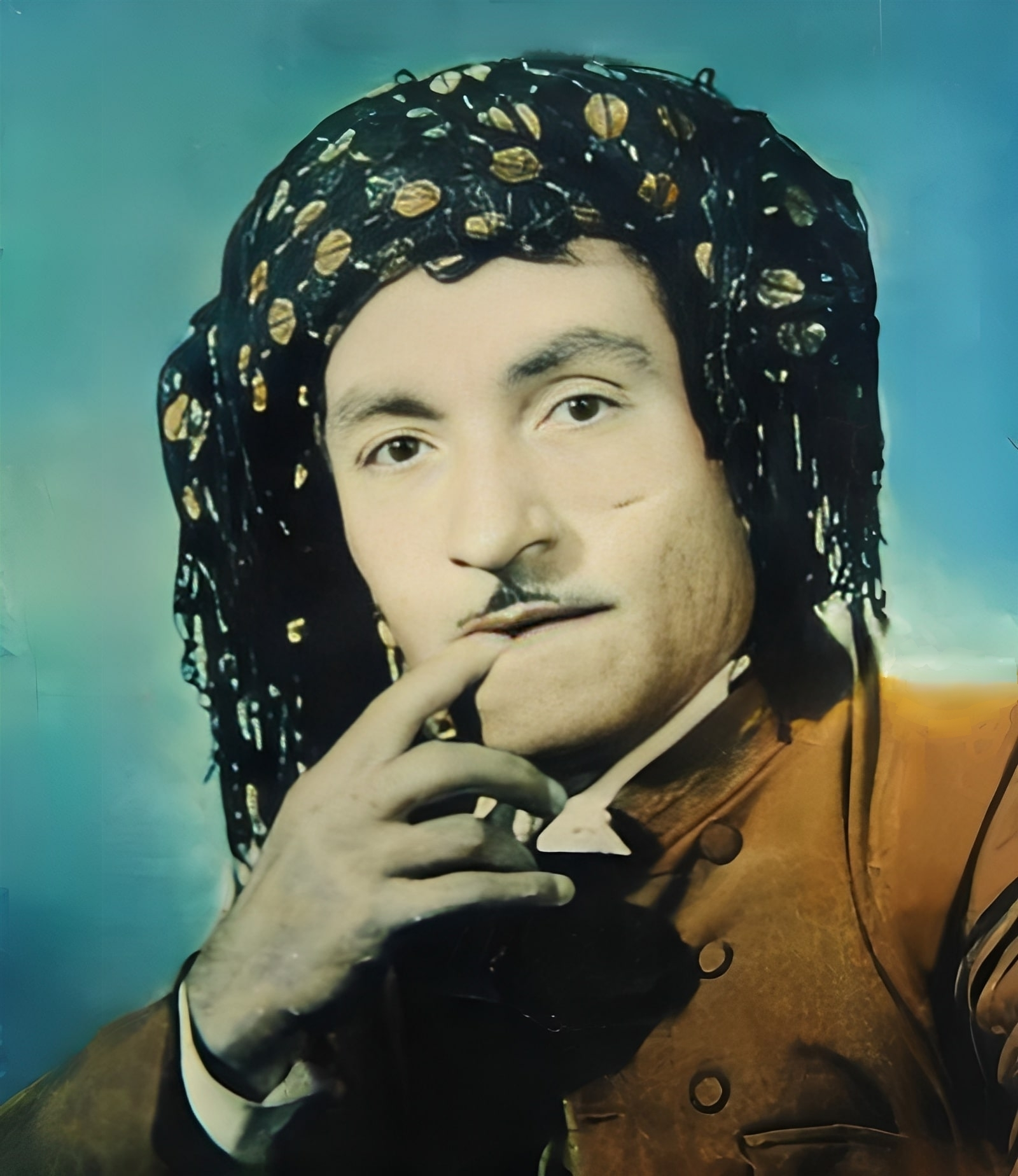
Hesen Zîrek, one of the most widely recognized artists in Kurdish folk music

Kurdish folk music (Kurdish: میوزیکی فۆلکلۆری کوردی, romanized: Mîwzîkî folkilorî Kurdî or مۆسیقای فۆلکلۆر) is a musical tradition associated with the Kurdish people, encompassing a variety of regional styles, instruments, and lyrical themes. It is often transmitted orally and reflects aspects of Kurdish culture and history.

The earliest documented study of Kurdish folk music was conducted by Armenian priest and composer Komitas in 1903, when he published Chansons Kurdes, a collection of twelve Kurdish melodies he collected during his travels.

Kurdish folk music plays an important role in preserving oral tradition and expressing collective identity. Traditionally performed at social gatherings such as weddings, festivals, and Newroz celebrations. Distinct styles and instruments vary by region, reflecting the geography and linguistic diversity of Kurdish communities.

Musical styles often differ not only between regions but also from one village to another, reflecting the localized character and oral transmission of Kurdish folk traditions.

== History and background ==
Kurdish folk music has a long history that is closely connected with the cultural and political experiences of the Kurdish people. Traditionally transmitted through oral tradition, these songs often carry themes ranging from historical narratives to epic poetry and legends.

The introduction of phonograph technology in the late 1920s marked an important phase in the documentation of Kurdish music. Recording studios in Baghdad began to capture the performances of Kurdish artists, contributing to the preservation and wider dissemination of their musical heritage.

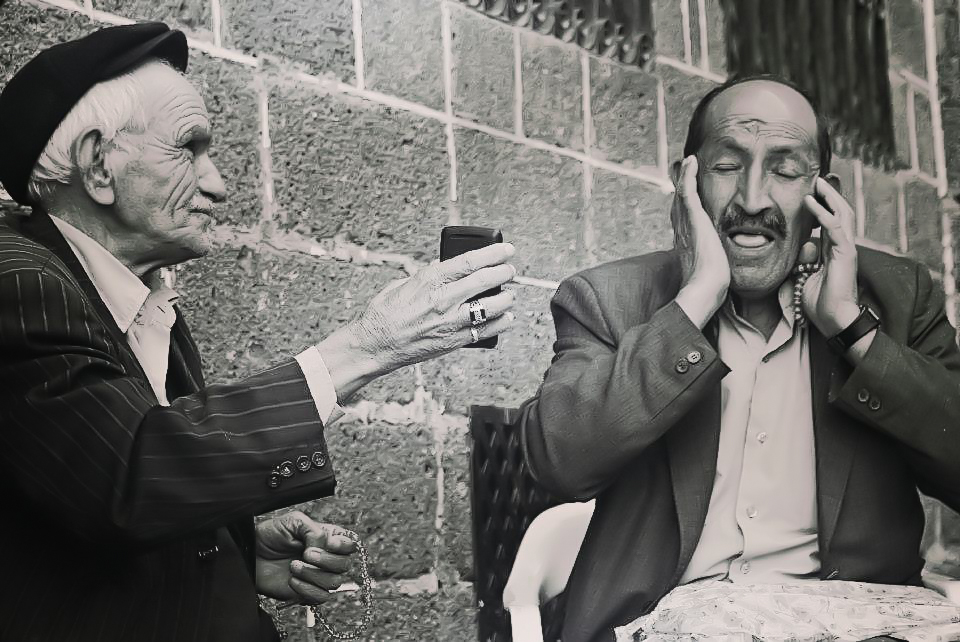
A Dengbêj player

Historically, Dengbêjs, traditional Kurdish bards, have played a central role in conveying oral history and ancestral tales through song and spoken word. Their performances are key to the narrative tradition within Kurdish music, often recounting events, genealogies, and heroic sagas.

The development of Kurdish folk music has been deeply affected by socio-political conditions. At various points in history, expressions of Kurdish identity, including music, have faced bans, censorship, and cultural suppression, particularly in countries where Kurds form a minority population.

The political experiences of the Kurdish people have profoundly shaped the content and purpose of their folk music. Songs frequently explore themes of resistance, self-determination, and the struggle for cultural and political rights. This politicized dimension became especially pronounced during the 1990s in Turkey, where Kurdish folk music emerged as a form of cultural expression and solidarity amid state-imposed restrictions.

== Cultural erasure ==
Throughout the 20th century, several Kurdish folk songs were appropriated and incorporated into the canon of Turkish folk music, often without recognition of their Kurdish origin. In some cases, Kurdish-language lyrics were replaced with Turkish ones, and the songs were presented as part of the national Turkish cultural heritage. This process has contributed to the erasure of Kurdish contributions to the region's musical history.

== Instruments ==
Kurdish folk music includes a variety of traditional instruments that are integral to its performance and stylistic expression.

=== String Instruments ===
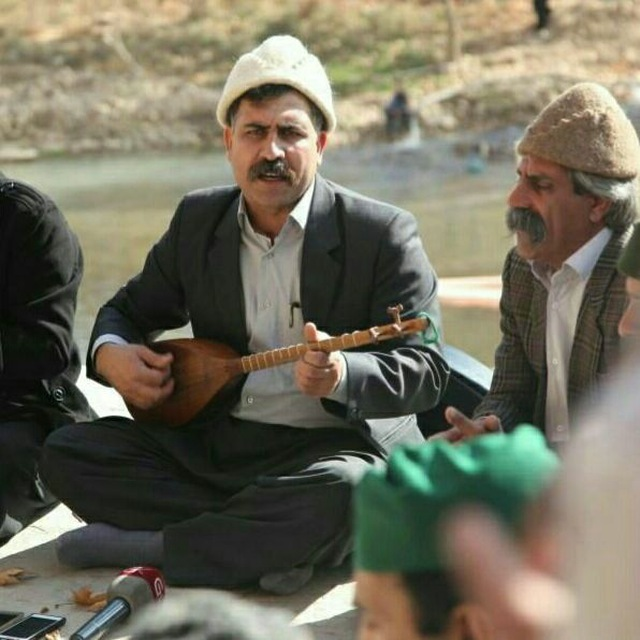
Musician and luthier Ghobad Ghobadi, a face of Yarsanism plays a Kurdish tanbur.

- Tembûr: A long-necked, fretted lute with a pear-shaped body, the tembûr holds significant cultural and spiritual importance, particularly among the Yarsan religious community and Sufi Dervishs. It is predominantly crafted in regions like Kermanshah, Kurdistan, and Lorestan provinces. The instrument typically features three metal strings and is played using a distinct technique involving the strumming of individual fingers.
- Kemançe: A bowed string instrument with a spherical body and a long neck, the kamancheh is integral to Kurdish classical and folk music. It is played vertically and is known for its expressive range.
- Oud: A short-necked, fretless lute with a deep, rounded back, the oud is used in Kurdish music and is known for its rich, resonant tones, it is popular among Kurds in Turkey and Kurds in Iraq.
- Cümbüş: a long necked, fretless lute showing resemblance to the Banjo with its sound being a mix of the Saz and the Oud, it is popular among Kurds in Turkey and Kurds in Syria

=== Wind Instruments ===
- Zurna: A loud, double-reed woodwind instrument, the zurna is commonly used in outdoor celebrations and is often accompanied by the dehol drum.
- Dûzele: Also known as donay or ghoshmeh, the dozaleh is a double-piped wind instrument producing a continuous, harmonious sound. It is traditionally made from reed or metal and is played in various ceremonies.
- Şhimshal: The shimshal, also called bilûr, is a type of Kurdish flute made of wood or reed. It produces a soft and emotional sound and is typically played in pastoral and folk settings.

=== Percussion Instruments ===
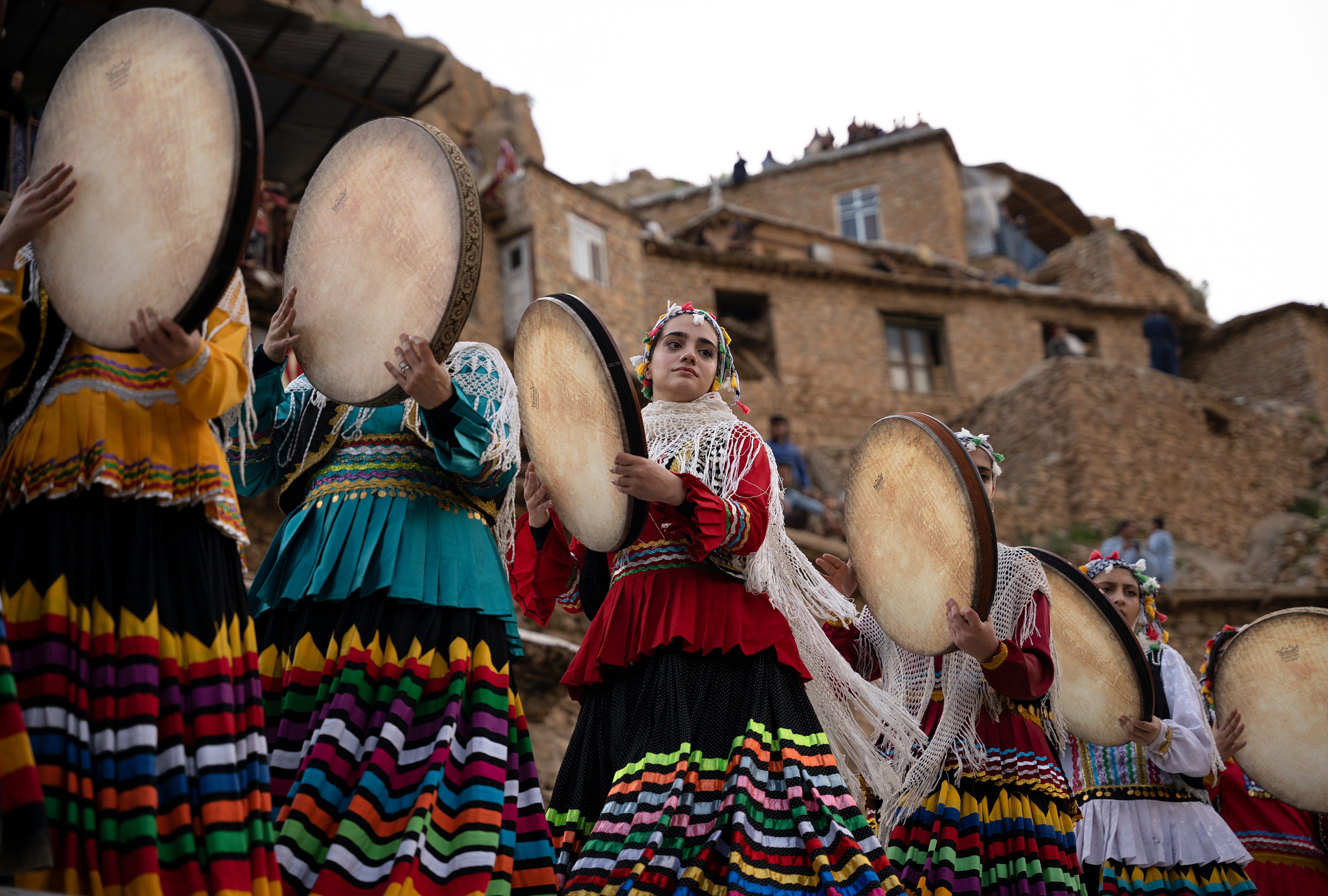
Daf playing ceremony in Palangan village, Iranian Kurdistan

- Daf: A large frame drum with metal rings attached to the inside, the daf is central to Kurdish music, especially in religious and spiritual contexts. It produces a resonant sound and is often used in group performances.
- Dehol or Tepll: A large, double-headed drum played with sticks, the dehol provides the rhythmic foundation in many Kurdish musical ensembles, particularly during festive occasions.
- Darbuka: Also known as the goblet drum, the darbuka is a hand-played percussion instrument that adds intricate rhythms to Kurdish music.

== See also ==
- Ziryab
- Kurdish dance
- Middle Eastern music
