= Salavatabad (mountain) =

Mountain range in Iran

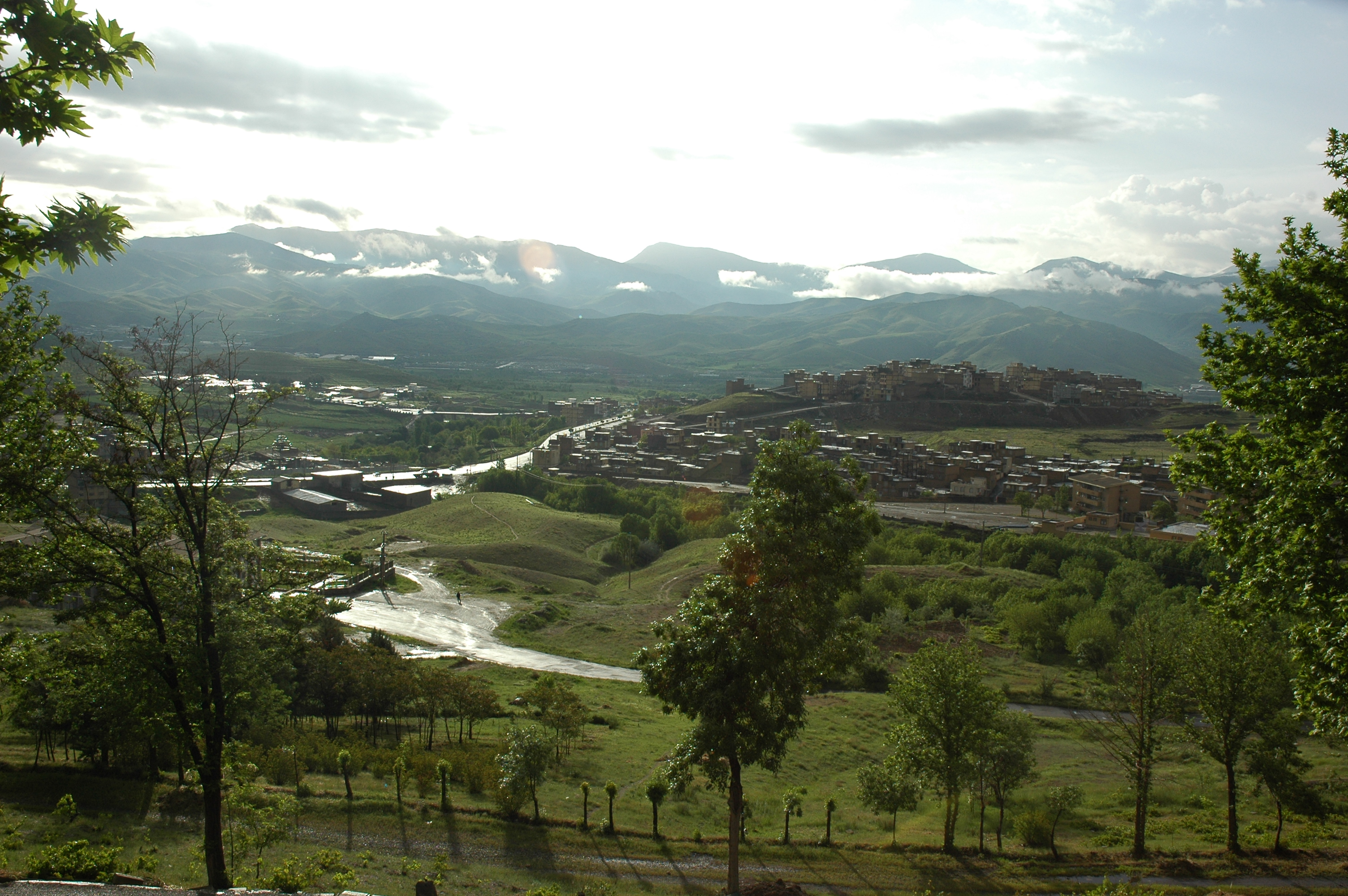
A view of Mount Salavatabad.

Salavatabad (Kurdish: سلوات ئاوا ، سه له وات ئاوا, Persian: صلوات آباد) is a mountain in the west part of Sanandaj city, Kurdistan province, western Iran.

It is one a subrange of Zagros Mountains in the west of Iran.

Papaver armeniacum has been found growing on the mountain.

== Geography ==
The main road connecting Sanandaj to Hamedan crosses the mountains.

The river of "Qeshlaq" (Kurdish:قشلاق), a branch of Sirvan River, runs adjacent to the mountain range.
