= Mohammad Mamle =

Kurdish musical artist

Mamlê

Background information
- Born: 1 June 1925
- Died: 23 January 1999 (aged 73)

Muhammad Mamle (Kurdish: محەممەد ماملێ, romanized: Mihemed Mamlê; 1 June 1925 – 23 January 1999) was a Kurdish musician and singer. He sang, wrote and renewed many Kurdish folkloric songs. He is regarded as an influential and important figure among the Kurds and others.

He died on 23 January 1999 at the age of 73 in the city of Mehabad, and was buried in the Budak Sultan Cemetery. His son Abdullah Mamlê is also a professional singer.

He is known for singing Kurdish poetries, especially Hêmin Mukriyanî’s poems. One of his famous songs is “Bilwêrî Şiwan”.

== January 3rd ==
January is a significant month for Kurdistan. It is considered a time of national identity building. The people of Kurdistan celebrate January 2 as the establishment of the Independent Kurdistan Republic in the Kurdistan Region of Iraq. However, in January 1999, a tragic incident occurred, which overshadowed the joy of the masses. On January 3, Mehemed Mamlê, a Kurdish national artist, passed away. He was a loyal and dedicated servant of the nation who had taken up the honorary weapon of Pêşmerge. His death was an opportunity for the Kurdish people living in Iran to express their anger against the criminal system of the Islamic Republic. The streets of Mehabad were filled with people, who carried Mamle's body on their shoulders, chanted national slogans, and showed their position against an oppressive regime. The tomb of the poets and artists of Mehabad became the resting place of Mamlê's body, where he could look at the beautiful procession of Kurdishness from Budaq Sultan alongside his loved ones and his people.
