= Dengbêj =

Type of Kurdish folk song

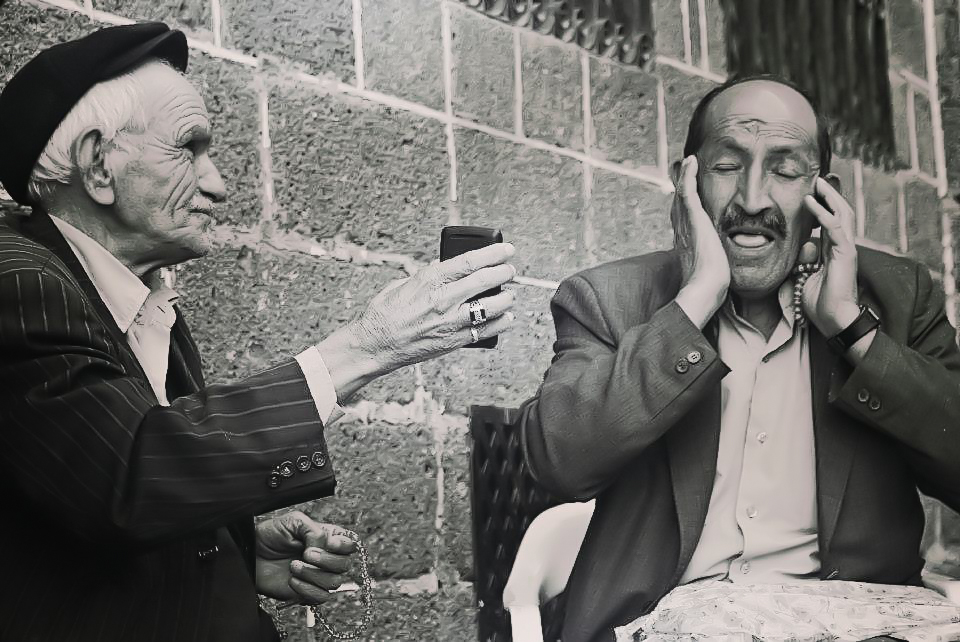
Dengbêj performing

Dengbêj (Kurdish: dengbêjî) is a Kurdish music genre sung by Dengbêjs (singing storytellers). There have been many terms to describe Dengbêjs throughout history, and today, several singing storytellers use Dengbêj as part of their own artistic name. Dengbêjs are viewed as a way to transmit the traditions of their Kurdish ancestors in times as it was not possible to publish in Kurdish or about Kurdish history. Since many documents about certain Kurdish events do not exist, there are attempts to analyze them through the songs of the Dengbêjs. Their songs pertain to Kurdish geography, history, and recent events, but also lullabies and love songs.

== History ==
Roger Lescot has performed a study through a large amount of Dengbêjs during the French Mandate in Syria and Lebanon. In the 1930s the Turkish Government implemented fines on every word that was spoken in Kurdish, putting the tradition of Dengbêjs singing in danger and almost became extinct in Turkish Kurdistan. In the 1980s the Dengbêjs were persecuted for singing in Kurdish, as it was forbidden in Turkey to sing in Kurdish language. At that time Dengebêjs were recorded clandestinely on cassette tapes and distributed.

In 1991, the Turkish president Turgut Özal announced that the use of the Kurdish language became legal except for broadcasts, publications, education and in politics. The Dengbêjs were again able to perform with more freedom. From 1994 onward, the Dengbêjs were supported by Kurdish politicians to attend festivals and TV shows outside of Turkey and from the 2000s also within Turkey. Dengbêj music became politicized and as a sign of Kurdish nationalism, which was confronted by Turkish nationalism

The Kilam is a specialty of the Dengbêjs, where they just let out spontaneously what moves them, and do not even pause after the end of a phrase. The style of a stran is melodic and rhythmic, popular and love songs sung at weddings are sung in the stran style. They sing mostly without instruments accompanying them. Traditionally Dengbêjs need to learn ancient Dengbêj songs before performing their own songs.

In 2003 the first Mala Dengbêjan (Dengbêj House in Kurdish) was in inaugurated in Van, Turkey. In May 2007 the Democratic Society Party (DTP) led Municipality of Diyarbakır supported the establishment of the Mala Dengbêjan in Diyarbakır. In several other cities, Dengbêj houses were founded as well. The revitalization of the Dengbej tradition was supported by the European Union.

Well-known Dengbêjs include Karapetê Xaço, Evdalê Zeynikî and Şakîro.

== See also ==
- List of music genres and styles
