= Kurdish music =

Part of Kurdish culture

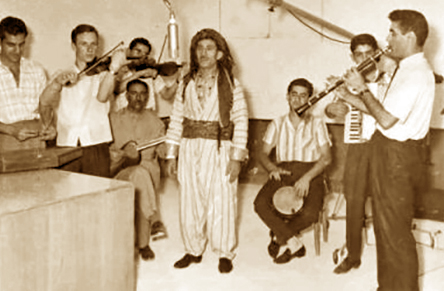
Hesen Zîrek, Kurdish folk singer

Kurdish music (Kurdish: میوزیکی کوردی, romanized: Mûzîkî Kurdî, or مۆسیقای کوردی) refers to music performed in the Kurdish languages and Zaza-Gorani languages. The earliest study of Kurdish music was initiated by the renowned Armenian priest and composer Komitas in 1903, when he published his work "Chansons kurdes transcrites par le pere Komitas" which consisted of twelve Kurdish melodies which he had collected. Karapetê Xaço, another Armenian, also preserved many traditional Kurdish melodies throughout the 20th century by recording and performing them. In 1909, Scholar Isya Joseph published the work "Yezidi works" in which he documented the musical practice of the Yazidis including the role of the musician-like qewal figures and the instruments used by the minority.

Kurdish music appeared in phonographs in the late 1920s, when music companies in Baghdad began recording songs performed by Kurdish artists.

Despite being secondary to vocals, Kurds use many instruments in traditional music. Musical instruments include the tembûr (see Kurdish tanbur), saz, qernête, daf, duduk, kaval, long flute (şimşal), kemenche, oboe (zirne) and drum (dahol).

== Definition ==
Traditional Kurdish music is culturally distinct from Arabic, Armenian and Turkish music, and mostly composed by people who remained anonymous. Thematically, the music were of melancholic and elegiac character, but has since then incorporated more upbeat and joyous melodies.

Kurdish folklore consists of three genres: the storytellers (çîrokbêj), bards (dengbêj) and popular singers (stranbêj).

Moreover, there are religious-themed songs (lawje) seasonal musical topics, for example "payizok" that are songs about the return to the summer pastures performed in autumn. Kurdish improvisations are called teqsîm.

== Prohibition ==
In Iraq, tolerance for Kurdish music ceased with the Saddam regime (1979–2003) which put in place restrictions against Kurdish culture. Between 1982 and 1991 the performance and recording of songs in Kurdish was also banned in Turkey.

== See also ==
- Kurdish dance
- Kurdish classical music
- Kurdish folk music
