= Hesen Zîrek =

Kurdish musical artist

Zîrek Hesen حەسەن زیرەک
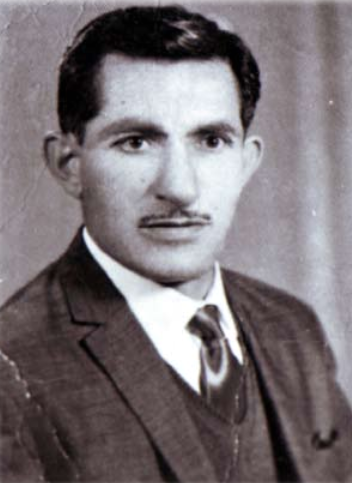

Background information
- Born: Hesen Abdullah Rahman; November 29, 1921; Bukan, West Azerbaijan, Iran
- Origin: Kurdish
- Died: June 26, 1972 (aged 50) Bukan, West Azerbaijan, Iran
- Genres: Classical, folk
- Occupation: Musician
- Instrument: Vocals
- Works: Newroz
- Years active: 1953–1972
- Spouse(s): Mediya Zandi; Rabia Serencam

Hesen Zîrek (Kurdish: حەسەن زیرەک, Kurdish pronunciation: [hæ.sæn ziːˈɾæk]; 29 November 1921 – 26 June 1972) was a Kurdish singer-songwriter, known for his recordings of Kurdish folk and classical songs. He was famous for his classical and sensual lyrics, and it is believed that he composed over a thousand songs in his lifetime.

== Early life and family ==
A part of Hesen Zîrek's song "Şew" (lit. 'Night'), adapted from a poem given to him by Kurdish poet Sayed Kamil Imami.

Hesen Abdullah Rahman, known professionally as Hesen Zîrek, was born into a Kurdish family. He had two brothers, Hussein and Kaka Mina, and one sister named Sarah. Following the early death of his father, Zîrek's mother, Amina, remarried, and as a result of the family's changing circumstances, he began working at a young age, around 8–9. He didn't attend formal schooling and remained illiterate throughout his life. He later married Mediya Zandi, with whom he had two daughters, Arezu and Sakar.

== The Shriek of Kurdistan ==
The Shriek of Kurdistan (Kurdish: چریکەی کوردستان, romanized: Çirîkey Kurdistan) is a Kurdish-language biography book written by Hesen Zîrek, with assistance from his wife Mediya Zandi. It was published in 1966 by Sāzmān-i Intishārāt-i Burekeyî, in Tehran, Iran. Shortly after its publication, Zîrek was banned from performing on Iranian state radio, as publishing books in Kurdish was prohibited under the government of Mohammad Reza Pahlavi. In the second edition of the book, Faraidoon Moradi provided the musical notation for 16 of Hesen Zîrek's songs.

The book is considered one of the first Kurdish publications of its kind in Pahlavi Iran. After the publication of the book, a warrant was issued for Hesen Zîrek's arrest by SAVAK on charges of 'spying against the state'. Following this, Hesen Zîrek fled to Iraqi Kurdistan and joined the Kurdish revolution.

== Influence ==
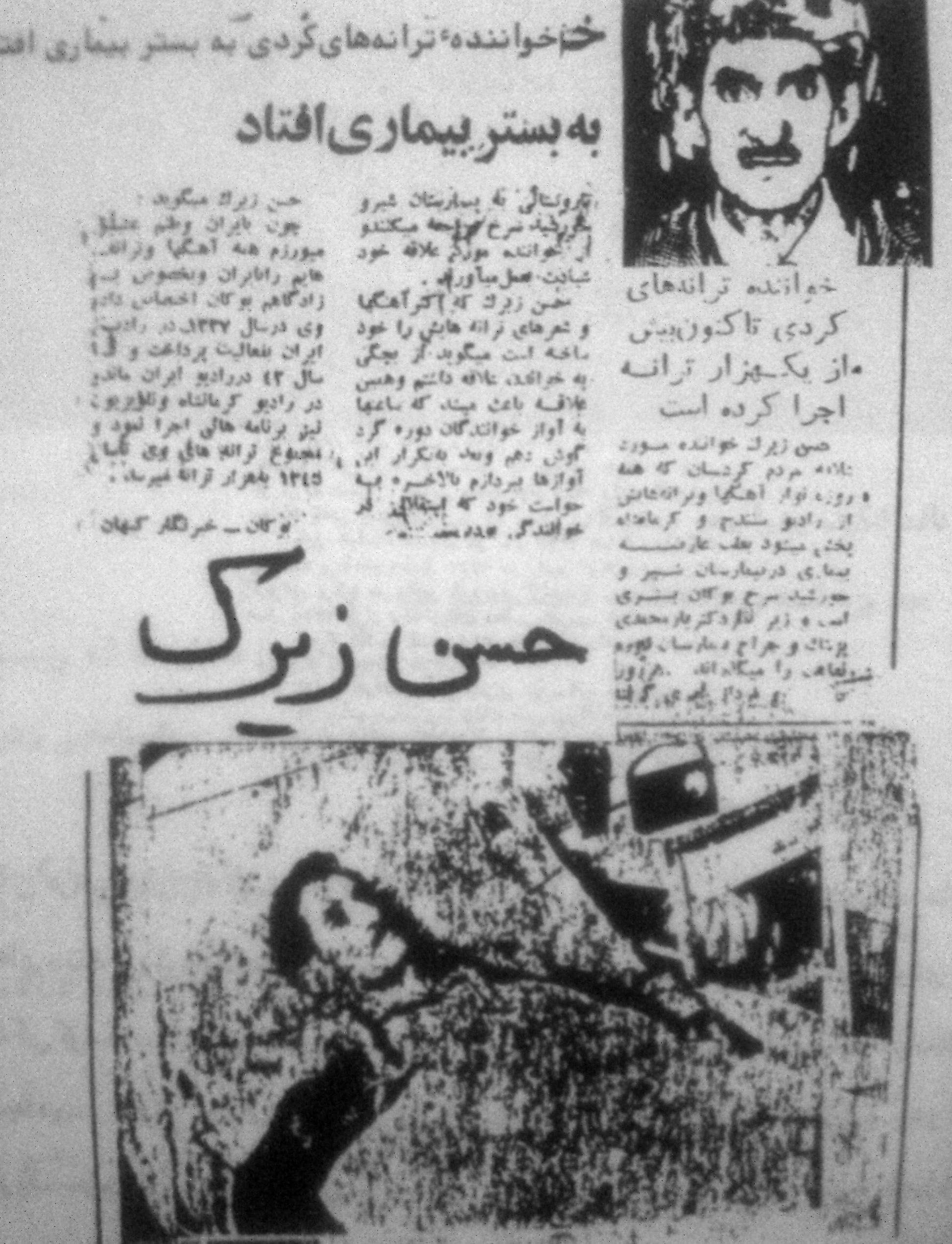
Kayhan newspaper publication reporting on the illness of Hesen Zîrek.

Despite his death in 1972, Zîrek's music continues to be widely appreciated, and his legacy is recognized in various ways, including the annual commemorations in Silêmanî. Zîrek's recordings are considered by some to be culturally significant in the preservation of Kurdish musical traditions.
