= Govenda Azadîxwazan =

Studio album by Şivan Perwer
- Released: 1975
- Genre: Kurdish music
- Length: 47:25
- Language: Kurdish

Şivan Perwer chronology
Govenda Azadîxwazan (1975)	Hevalê Bargiran im (1975)

Govenda azadîxwazan (Kurdish: گۆڤەندا ئازادیخوازان, romanized: Govenda azadîxwazan, lit. 'The Dance of Those Who Want Liberation') is the first album by Kurdish artist Şivan Perwer, released in 1975 as a cassette album. Perwer was accompanied by the Kurdish tanbur, his signature instrument.

The lyrics of the album have been described as 'militant' and emphasized on Kurdish identity and the desire for an independent Kurdistan, while reserving space for Marxist and anti-colonial sentiments as well. The album would become the first album that fused traditional Kurdish music with the Kurdish cause.

The album was released again in 2012 as a studio album by Pel Records.

== Impact ==
The cassette was distributed clandestinely due to the ban on the Kurdish language by Turkey and Perwer jeopardized his newly found career for his refusal to sing in Turkish and by singing in Kurdish publicly. Perwer ultimately fled to Germany in 1976.

== Track listing ==
All of the songs are in Kurmanji:

No.	Title	Writer(s)	Length
1.	"Ger ez şehîd bim, dayê tu megrî"	Mehmed Emîn Bozarslan	7:48
2.	"Govenda azadîxwazan"	Şivan Perwer	2:55
3.	"Ey karker û xebatkar"	Cigerxwîn	7:13
4.	"Bila bihar bi xêr bê"	Cigerxwîn	6:20
5.	"Hêsirê min dibarin"	Mihemed Şêxo	3:52
6.	"Ka Kurdistana min ka"	Cigerxwîn	5:11
7.	"Li Dêrsimê"	Şivan Perwer	7:04
8.	"Tev jir û zana bin"	Şivan Perwer	4:19
9.	"Ey felek"	Cigerxwîn	2:43
Total length:			47:25
