= University of Rojava =

Primary University in Rojava (AANES)

Rojava University
- Zanîngeha Rojava
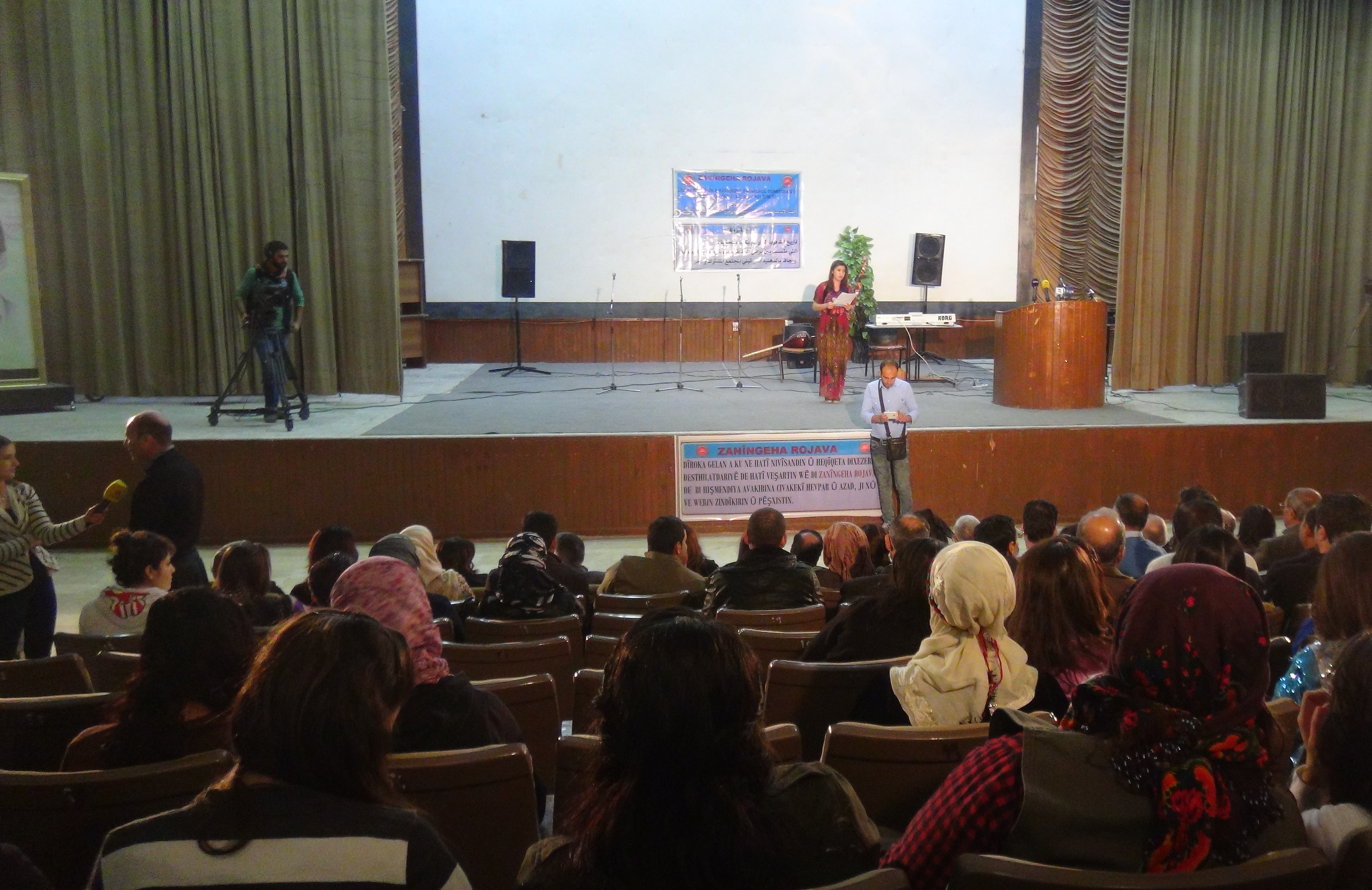
- Opening of University of Rojava
- Type: Public university
- Established: 2016
- Affiliations: Universities coordinator of north and east Syria
- Location: Qamishli, Al-Hasakah, Rmelan, Syria (Note: The university is located in the territory of the Autonomous Administration of North and East Syria part of Syria. See Education in Rojava for details.)
- Website: rojava-uni.ac

Rojava University (Kurdish: Zanîngeha Rojava, Arabic: جامعة روجآفا, Classical Syriac: ܒܝܬ ܨܘܒܐ ܕܪܘܓܐܦܐ), is a Syrian public university in Qamishli. The university was established in July 2016 with curricula for medicine, engineering, sciences, arts, and humanities.

Additionally, the university offers programmes for primary school education and Kurdish literature. The university maintains a partnership with Paris 8 University in Saint-Denis, France and California Institute of Integral Studies in San Francisco. In August, the university opened registration for students in the academic year 2016–2017. An opening ceremony was held on 20 November 2016.

Beginning in October 2017, its second academic year, the university added a jineology programme. 711 students attend the university liberal arts, jineology, petrochemistry, agriculture, fine arts, and pedagogy with courses taught in Kurdish (the primary instructional language), Arabic and English. In 2019, the university also launched a programme for women to learn to overcome sexism within the family and society.

Due to Operation Olive Branch many students from the University of Afrin have been allocated seats at the University of Rojava to continue their studies.

In 2020, the university moved some of its courses online due to the COVID-19 pandemic.

== See also ==
- University of Afrin
- Mesopotamian Social Sciences Academy
