= Mesopotamian Social Sciences Academy =

The Mesopotamian Social Sciences Academy is a co-educational university in Qamishli, a city in de facto autonomous region, the Democratic Autonomous Administration of North and East Syria. The academy opened in 2013 offering classes in criticism and self-criticism, the democratic system and the Kurdish language.

The school year has three terms, lasting 3-4 months each. The curriculum consists mainly of history and sociology classes. Jineology is also taught there. Teaching occurs mainly in Kurdish.

There was a book donation drive organised early in the life of the university, which, amongst others, was donated to by AK Press.

== See also ==
- University of Afrin
- University of Rojava
