= Ciwan Haco =

Kurdish singer

Ciwan Haco جوان حاجۆ
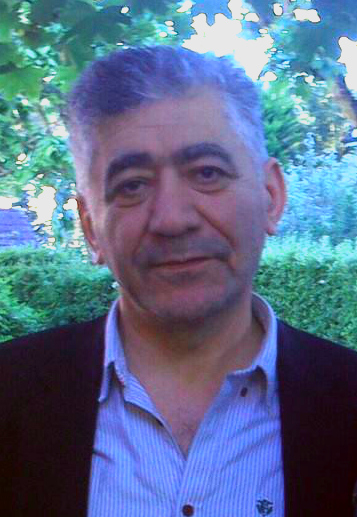

Background information
- Born: Ciwan Haco; 17 August 1957 (age 68); Qamishli, Syria
- Origin: Kurds
- Genres: Kurdish music
- Years active: 1970-present
- Label: Red Music Digital

Ciwan Haco is a Syrian Kurdish singer. He was born in Tirbespî near Qamishli in northern Syria. His grandfather was originally from Doğançay in Turkey. After finishing high school, he left for Germany in order to continue his studies. He studied musicology at the Ruhr University Bochum. He is now residing in Sweden.He is most well known for his album Gula Sor.

== His music ==
At the beginning he did not count with the support of his family due to fact at that time only the lower classes played music. But at 14 he released his first album and with 17 he performed for the first time in front of a larger public. Ciwan Haco is one of the first Kurdish singers to combine Kurdish folk music with western style pop music, rock, blues and jazz. In 2003 he received permission for a concert in Batman, which was attended by more than 200,000 people. Ciwan Haco is known for his lyrics that are often purposely simple and to which the main recurrent theme is love, with variations around this same theme. The main song from his last album Off (2006), Li hêviya te (Waiting for you) features vocals in both Kurdish language and French language (the latter being sung by a female vocalist).

Similar to other famous Kurdish musicians like Şivan Perwer, Haco sometimes uses poems by famous Kurdish poets such as Cegerxwîn or Qedrîcan in his songs. He has also recorded one of the novels of Mehmed Uzun named Destana Egîdekî.

Very popular in the Kurdish diaspora as with the Kurdish people in the Middle East, Ciwan Haco has given concerts in many parts of Europe.

== Movies ==
Wrote music for movies - Dol(2007), E: xile(2012), Chaplin of the Mountains(2013) and Sîrusta Gerîla(2017). Also played as an actor in Dol(2007). His song was used in the soundtrack of the documentary "1001 Apples".

== Discography ==
=== Albums ===
To date he has released 17 albums and a live VCD and DVD

- Emîna Emîna (1970)
- Pêşmerge (1979)
- Diyarbekîr (1981)
- Welatperestî (1982)
- Gula Sor (1983)
- Leyla (albûm) (1985)
- Girtiyên Azadiyê (albûm) (1987)
- Çaw Bella (albûm) (1989)
- Sî û Sê Gule (1991)
- Dûrî (1994)
- Bilûra Min (1997)
- Destana Egîdekî (1998)
- Derya (2003)
- Konsera Batmanê (2003) (VCD & DVD)
- Na Na (2004)
- Off (2006)
- Veger (2012)
- Esmer (ft. Hülya Avşar) (2012)
- Felek (2018 - Hamburg)

=== Singles ===
- Ev Jiyan (feat. Vellúa – 2020)
