= Komalên Ciwan =

Kurdish militant group

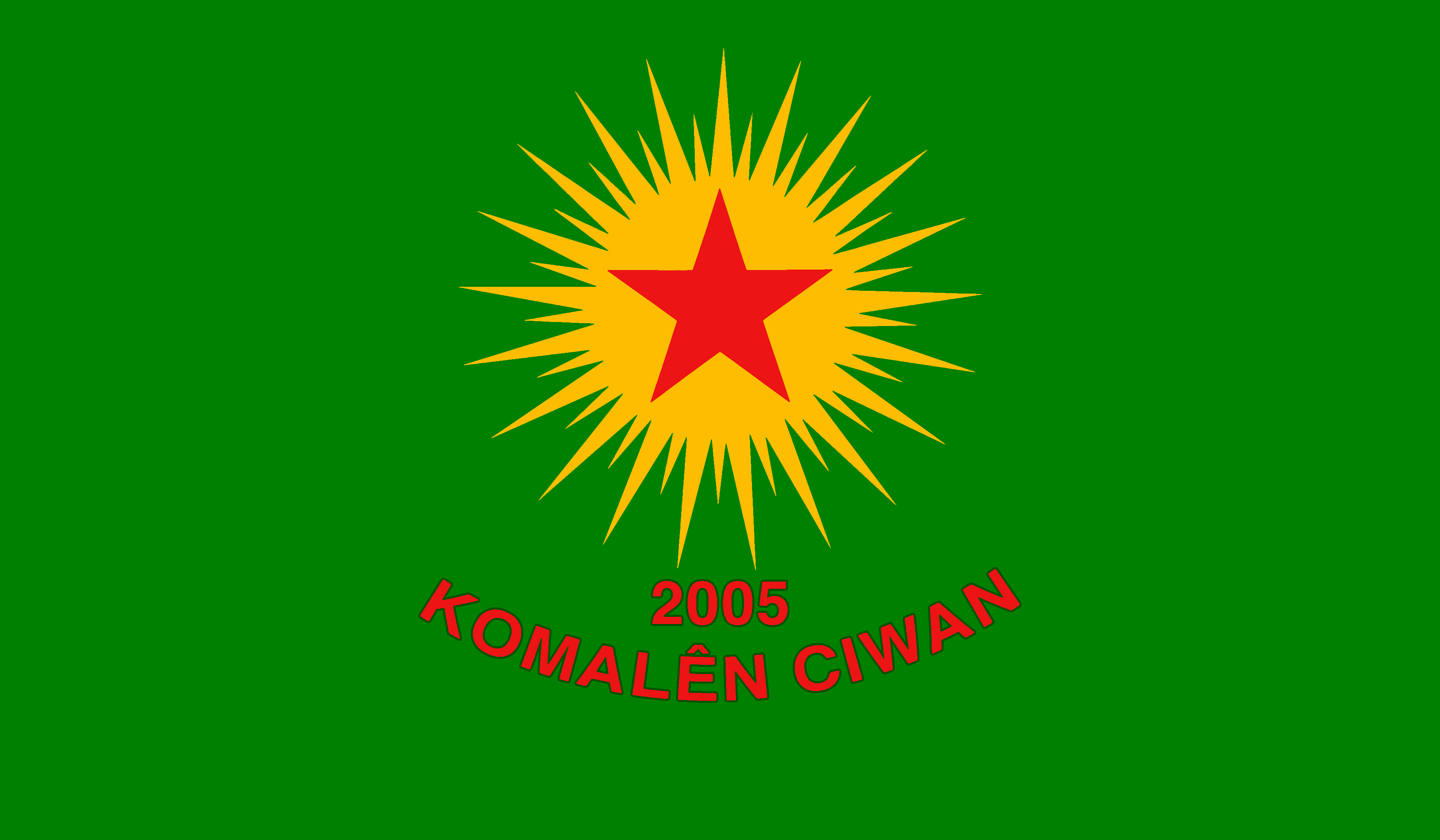
- Founded: 2005
- Dates active: 2005–present
- Split from: Tevgera Ciwanên Azad a Kurdistanê
- Allegiance: Kurdistan Workers' Party
- Ideology: Jineology; Anti-Fascism
- Website: komalen-ciwan.com

Komalên Ciwan is a Kurdish militant group and sector of the Kurdistan Workers' Party (PKK), established in 2005 as a successor to the Free Youth Movement of Kurdistan (Kurdish: Tevgera Ciwanên Azad a Kurdistanê).

== History ==
The group has a congress which goes throughout parts of the Rojava region and holds meetings with various Kurdish youth organizations.

Members of the group and affiliates of the group have been stopped from entering areas of Europe as asylum seekers and refugees from Syria due to the designation of the PKK as a terrorist organization.

Throughout 2019, Komalen Ciwan urged many people of Kurdish origin to join the group from women to teens and other ambiguous youths. The group stated that if Kurdish youth wanted to be "free" that they must join the group in order to help free the currently arrested leader of the PKK, Abdullah Öcalan.

In 2020, the leader of the group was arrested in Turkey.
