= Off (album) =

Studio album by Ciwan Haco
- Released: April 2006
- Genre: Pop

Off is the latest album of Kurdish artist Ciwan Haco. It was released in April 2006 in Europe. It features 13 songs, including the electro-pop "Li hêviya te" and several ballads. All songs are mainly sung in Kurdish, although a small part of the song "Li hêviya te" features brief French vocals (though sung by a woman, and not by Ciwan Haco himself).

== Track listing ==
1. "Ez dimam"
2. "Dil ketîme"
3. "Felek"
4. "Daristana te"
5. "Dipirsin"
6. "Kal"
7. "Xunav"
8. "Welatê min"
9. "Havîn"
10. "Li hêviya te"
11. "Winda bû"
12. "Hayê"
13. "Gotin sar dibin"
