= Tell Hamis Subdistrict =

Tell Hamis Subdistrict ناحية تل حميس
- Subdistrict
- Location of Tell Hamis Subdistrict within al-Hasakah Governorate

- Location in Syria
- Country: Syria
- Governorate: al-Hasakah
- District: Qamishli
- Seat: Tell Hamis

Area
  - Total: 1,498.73 km^{2} (578.66 sq mi)

Population (2004)
  - Total: 71,699
  - Density: 47.840/km^{2} (123.90/sq mi)
- Geocode: SY080201

Tell Hamis Subdistrict (Arabic: ناحية تل حميظ) is a subdistrict of Qamishli District in northeastern al-Hasakah Governorate, northeastern Syria. The administrative centre is the town of Tell Hamis.

At the 2004 census, the subdistrict had a population of 71,699.

== Cities, towns and villages ==
Cities, towns and villages of Tell Hamis Subdistrict
| PCode | Name | Population |
|---|---|---|
| C4639 | Tell Hamis | 5,161 |
| C4632 | Tell Maaruf | 2,632 |
| C4617 | Abu Khazaf | 1,987 |
| C4650 | Salima | 1,967 |
| C4655 | Hanjur Kabir | 1,928 |
| C4672 | Naem Elhyar | 1,764 |
| C4628 | Sadiyeh | 1,636 |
| C4674 | Flastin al-Sharqiyah | 1,608 |
| C4603 | Hasawiyah Fawqani | 1,488 |
| C4677 | Yathreb | 1,233 |
| C4611 | Tell Ahmed | 1,084 |
| C4606 | Safana W Akrasha | 986 |
| C4659 | Khawla Elazwar | 961 |
| C4589 | Khazaa | 928 |
| —N/a | ? | 909 |
| C4619 | Led Tell Hamis | 903 |
| C4669 | Farfara Tell Hamis | 901 |
| C4621 | Big Balqis | 885 |
| C4653 | Eastern Harset Elrad | 874 |
| C4601 | Tarahiyeh - Sheikh Salem | 847 |
| C4613 | Festat | 813 |
| C4591 | Tawarij Elghaanah | 798 |
| C4620 | Zbaa | 786 |
| C4635 | Rehiyeh Sawda | 773 |
| C4654 | Middle Sharmukh | 766 |
| —N/a | ? | 758 |
| C4600 | Granada Sharqiyah | 751 |
| C4675 | Cordoba Sharqiyah | 684 |
| —N/a | ? | 666 |
| C4629 | Khweitleh Reidat | 659 |
| C4608 | Hasawiyah Tahtani | 642 |
| —N/a | Yarmuk | 640 |
| C4646 | Kharnubi Hisu | 618 |
| C4652 | Big Hajiyeh | 616 |
| C4638 | Rehiyeh Madineh | 610 |
| C4668 | Kdeimiyat | 607 |
| C4609 | Qadessiyeh | 593 |
| C4663 | Akula Tell Hamis | 585 |
| C4642 | Bardeh | 568 |
| C4595 | Okath | 566 |
| —N/a | ? | 560 |
| C4594 | Taghleb | 554 |
| C4643 | Shora | 548 |
| C4641 | Husseiniyah Tell Hamis | 531 |
| C4664 | Bikaret Elhilaiya | 525 |
| C4645 | Tharan | 519 |
| C4651 | Zahraa | 519 |
| C4634 | Amara Eltawil | 501 |
| —N/a | Tell Bistan Kabir | 500 |
| —N/a | Khuaitilat al-Jadidah | 498 |
| —N/a | Tawil Harb | 490 |
| —N/a | Fares Saghir | 490 |
| C4607 | Abu Tweineh | 489 |
| C4667 | Mathluthet Hamzeh | 488 |
| C4627 | Western Tuhama | 478 |
| —N/a | ? | 474 |
| C4588 | Zorma al-Sugrah | 471 |
| C4671 | Mjerinat Mahal | 468 |
| C4624 | Skiriyeh | 462 |
| C4658 | Tamim | 445 |
| C4604 | Zarqaa | 423 |
| —N/a | ? | 420 |
| C4630 | Um Gadir | 419 |
| C4597 | Tell Ghazal | 414 |
| —N/a | Khuznat Jadida | 408 |
| C4623 | Rabeeah Tell Hamis | 400 |
| C4585 | Tell Iss | 399 |
| C4644 | Rasm Eldrue | 395 |
| —N/a | Al-Nasiriat Tell Hamis | 383 |
| C4660 | Sharmukh Kabir | 381 |
| C4679 | Hamdan | 376 |
| —N/a | Khirbet Aseat | 375 |
| —N/a | ? | 367 |
| C4633 | Tell Satih Sharqi | 364 |
| C4681 | Msheirfet Elhomor | 355 |
| C4587 | Zubayda | 344 |
| C4647 | Taef | 336 |
| C4599 | Rashidiyeh | 331 |
| C4622 | Abu Khashab | 327 |
| —N/a | ? | 324 |
| C4657 | Little Saghira | 319 |
| C4666 | Umaya | 309 |
| C4605 | Tamna Elbariyeh | 305 |
| C4598 | Tell Anbar | 302 |
| —N/a | ? | 301 |
| —N/a | ? | 294 |
| —N/a | Tell Khalil Tell Hamis | 290 |
| C4640 | Tell Maha | 285 |
| —N/a | Khuruf Saghir | 285 |
| C4625 | Kharab Askar | 279 |
| —N/a | Matina | 265 |
| C4584 | Tell Bustan Saghir | 264 |
| C4596 | Hdeibiyeh | 258 |
| C4636 | Rashidiyeh Tell Hamis | 258 |
| —N/a | Al-Maraj Tell Hamis | 254 |
| C4616 | Kherbet Nura | 244 |
| —N/a | Haifa Tell Hamis | 244 |
| C4665 | Eskandarun | 240 |
| C4614 | Khansaa | 240 |
| C4631 | Balqis Saghirat Sharqia | 238 |
| —N/a | Umm Kahif Tell Hamis | 231 |
| C4673 | Nasibeh Elmazeniyeh | 230 |
| C4656 | Harset Elrad al-Gharbia | 229 |
| C4678 | Qayrawan Tell Hamis | 224 |
| C4612 | Kherbet Elahmir | 204 |
| C4610 | Fokhariyeh | 203 |
| C4680 | Wael | 198 |
| —N/a | ? | 197 |
| C4590 | Kharab Elmahar | 195 |
| —N/a | ? | 186 |
| —N/a | ? | 183 |
| C4615 | Ghassan | 182 |
| —N/a | ? | 167 |
| C4626 | Wahabiyeh | 165 |
| C4592 | Tuffahiyeh Tell Hamis | 164 |
| —N/a | ? | 156 |
| C4637 | Jamiliya | 153 |
| C4676 | Kinana | 145 |
| C4586 | Tell Ehmeir | 132 |
| —N/a | ? | 128 |
| C4648 | Damdam | 126 |
| C4662 | Sharmukh Saghir | 119 |
| C4602 | Hdadiyeh Tell Hamis | 118 |
| C4661 | Kharnubieh Nayef | 110 |
| C4593 | Kharijet Tell Hamis | 101 |
| C4670 | Madinet Rehiyeh | 90 |
| C4649 | Ashwan | 76 |
| C4618 | Shamdiniyeh | 64 |
| —N/a | ? | 17 |
