= Al-Qahtaniyah, al-Hasakah =

Al-Qahtaniyah / Qubur al-Bid القحطانية / ܩܒܪ̈ܐ ܚܘܪ̈ܐ / Tirbespî
- Town
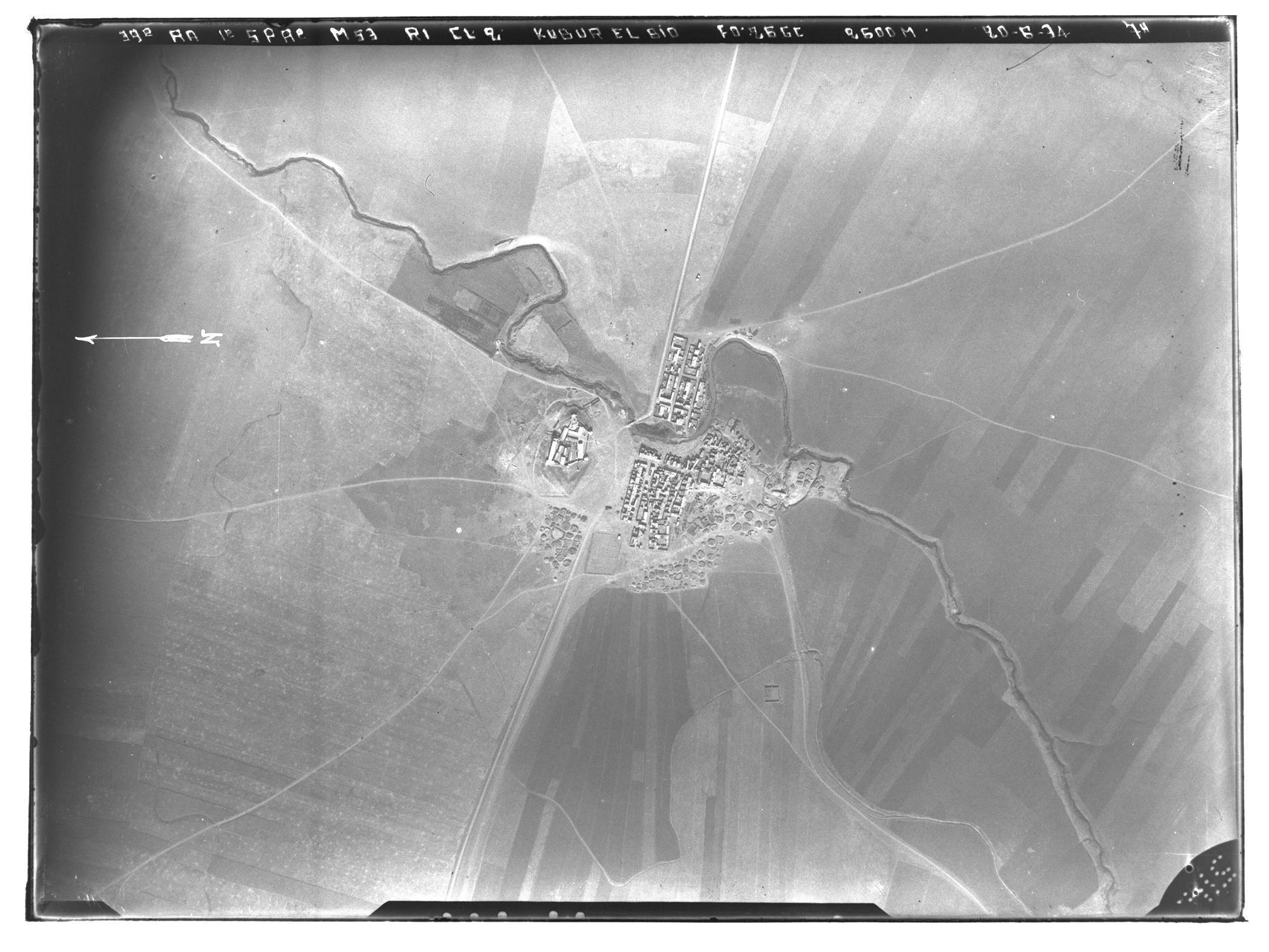
- Aerial photo from 1934 of the town

- Location of Al-Qahtaniyah in Syria
- Coordinates: 37.02811°N 41.54469°E
- Country: Syria
- Governorate: Hasakah
- District: Qamishli
- Subdistrict: al-Qahtaniyah
- Elevation: 405 m (1,329 ft)

Population (2004)
  - Total: 16,946
- Time zone: UTC+3 (AST)
- Geocode: C4751

Al-Qahtaniyah (Arabic: القحطانية) or Qubur al-Bid (Arabic: قبور البيض; Syriac: ܩܒܪ̈ܐ ܚܘܪ̈ܐ, romanized: Qabre Ḥewore; Kurdish: Tirbespî), is a town in the Hasakah Governorate, in northeastern Syria. It is the administrative center of al-Qahtaniyah Subdistrict, which consists of 103 localities. The town had a population of 16,946 in 2004, being the sixth largest town in the Al-Hasakah Governorate.

== Etymology ==
The names Qubur al-Bid, Qabre Ḥewore and Tirbespî all mean "white graves".

== History ==
During French control, before the establishment of the modern town, the site was known as Qubur al-Bid.

The modern town was founded by Hajo Agha of the Kurdish Hevêrkan tribe, which included some Yazidi families, in the early 1920s. By 1927, with 20,000 Christian refugees having immigrated during the past few years to the region from present-day Turkey, the town had a Christian majority (2,000 out of 3,000). Many Kurdish refugees also arrived in the area after the Sheikh Said rebellion. As part of the Arabization policies of the Syrian government, the name of the town was changed to Qubur al-Bid, and in 1969 the town was renamed Al‑Qahtaniyah.

On 13 March 2004, after the 2004 Qamishli riots when 30+ Kurdish civilians were killed in Qamlishli, residents of the town who protested the killings were shot at and injured by the Syrian Army.

In late July 2012, during the Syrian civil war, the YPG took control of the town. The Syriac/Assyrian Female Protection Forces of the Land Between Two Rivers also trained in the town.

== Demographics ==
In the present-day, the majority of the town's inhabitants are Kurds and Arabs, followed by a large number of Syriacs/Assyrians.

== Churches ==
The Syriac Orthodox Church of Our Lady (Syriac: ܥܕܬܐ ܕܝܠܕܬ ܐܠܗܐ ܡܪܝܡ ܠܣܘܪ̈ܝܝܐ ܬܪ̈ܝܨܝ ܫܘܒܚܐ; Arabic: كنيسة السيدة العذراء للسريان الأرثوذكس) is located in the town.

== Notable people ==
- Ciwan Haco (1957*), Kurdish singer
- Muhammad Khayr Ramdan Yusef
- Sleman Henno (1918-2006) Syriac Orthodox priest who wrote and published a book about the massacres of Assyrians in Turabdin
- Tuma Gawriye Nahroyo (1936-2022) The first Assyrian author who wrote and published the first poetry collection in Surayt

== See also ==
- Assyrians in Syria
- Kurds in Syria
