= Asia Ramazan Antar =

Kurdish fighter (1997–2016)

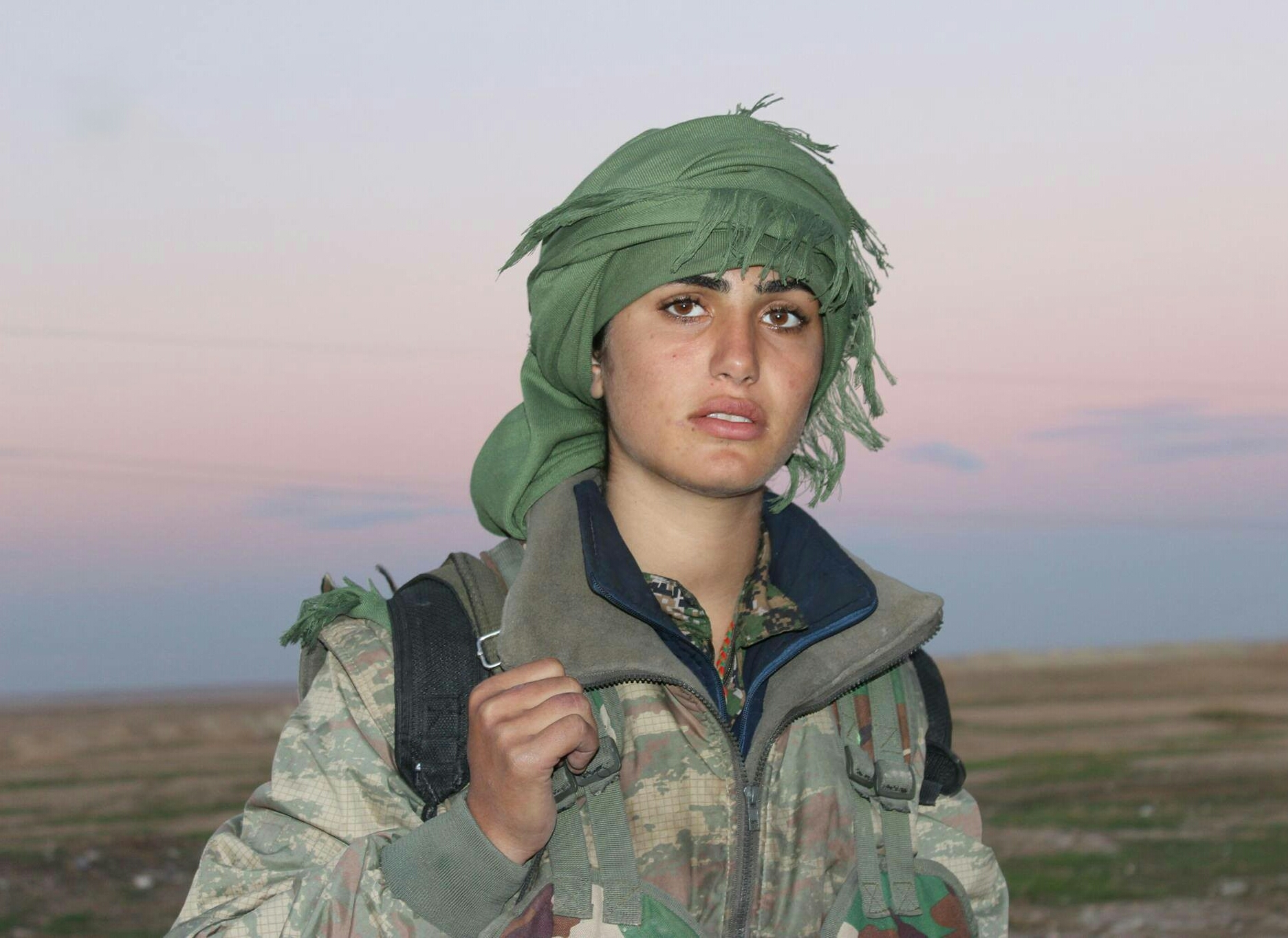
- Antar in 2015
- Born: 1997; Qamishli, Syria
- Died: 30 August 2016 (aged 19); Manbij, Syria
- Other name: Viyan Antar
- Military career
- Allegiance: SDF
- Service years: 2014–2016
- Nickname: Kurdish Angelina Jolie
- Unit: YPJ
- Conflicts: Syrian Civil War; Rojava conflict; Manbij offensive (2016) †

Asia Ramazan Antar (Kurdish: Asya Ramazan Antar, 1 January 1997 – 30 August 2016), also known as Viyan Antar, was a Kurdish YPJ fighter who rose to prominence during the Syrian Civil War, as she was symbolized as a symbol of the feminist struggle (Jineology) against ISIS by the international media.

In 2014, Antar joined the Women's Protection Units (YPJ) with the aim of fighting against ISIS. After photos of her spread across the internet, she was dubbed "the Kurdish Angelina Jolie" by international media for her physical resemblance to the actress. Other Kurdish fighters and activists of the Kurdish cause described these comparisons as sexist and objectifying.

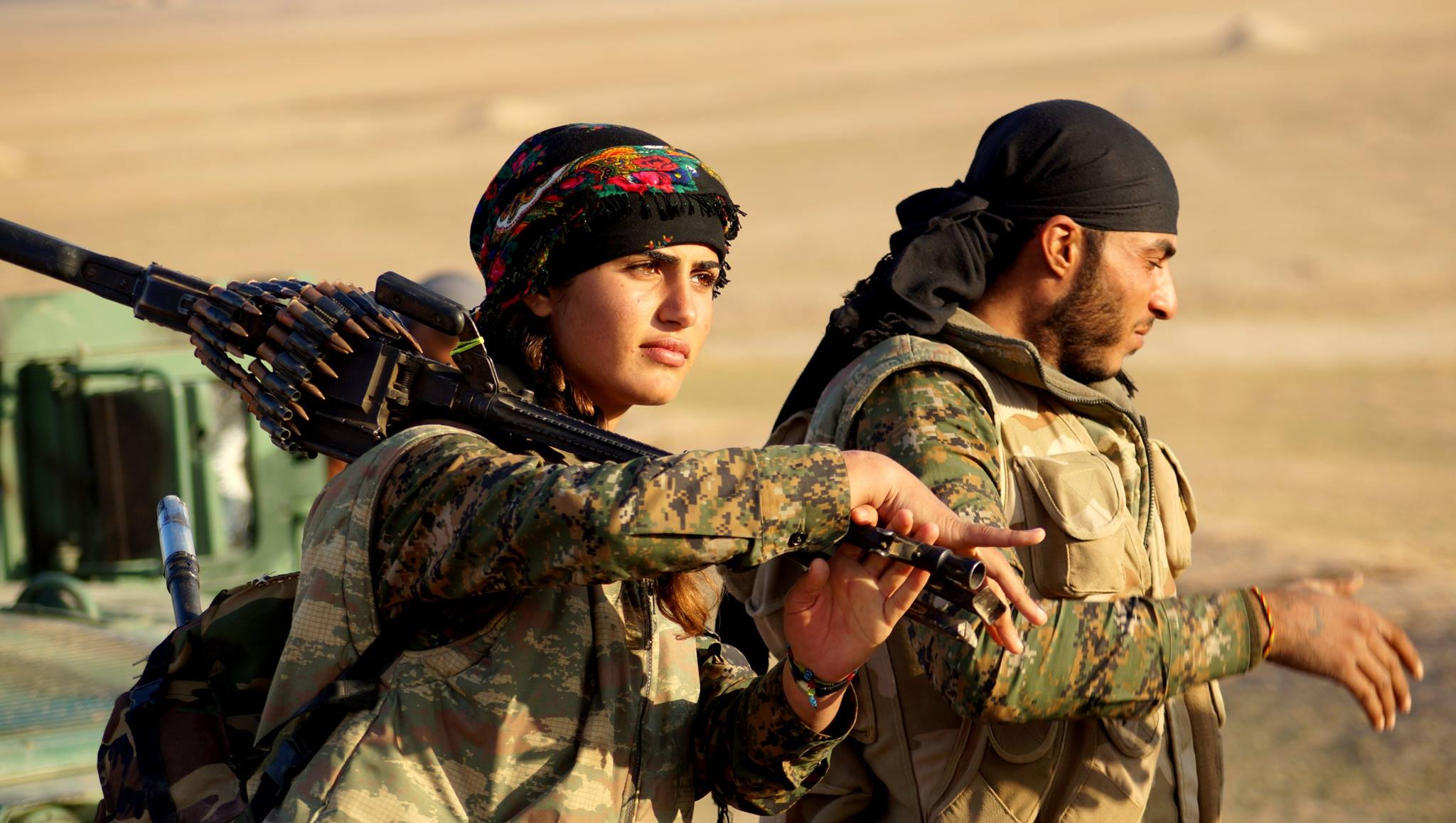
Antar in November 2015

Antar was killed in action on 30 August 2016, during the Manbij offensive against the Islamic State, at the age of 19.

== Early life ==
Born into a Kurdish family, Antar married very young through a marriage arranged by her family. After three months, she got divorced and joined the ranks of the Women's Protection Units (YPJ) to fight for the emancipation of women from the hands of patriarchal oppression in the region.

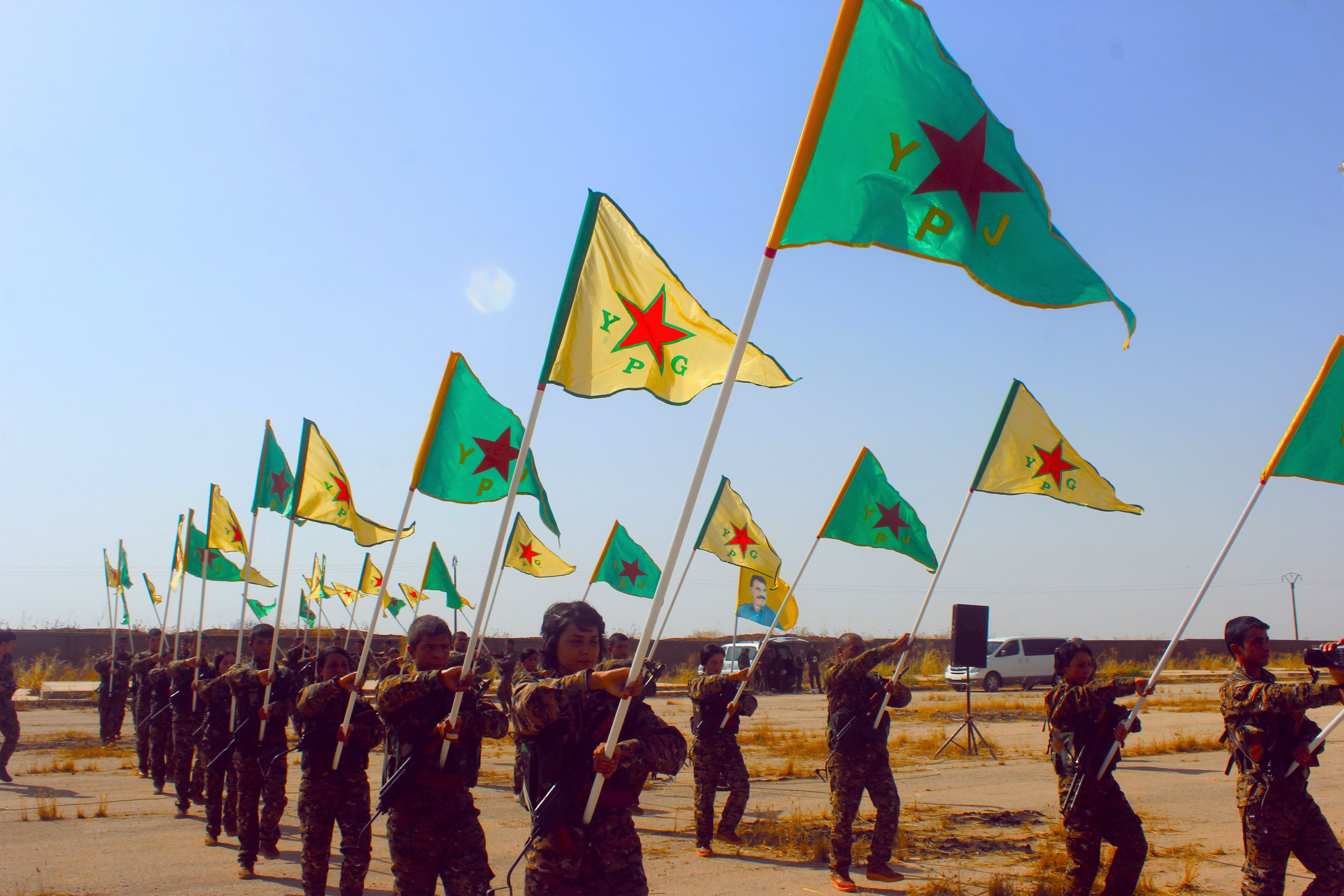
YPG and YPJ fighters, 2016

== Transcendence in the media ==
Antar gained international attention in 2015 when a photojournalist took photos of her and described her as "the Kurdish Angelina Jolie". Many media sites recirculated the photos, turning it into news and also comparing her with Spanish actress Penélope Cruz.

After her death, news headlines announced "the Kurdish Angelina Jolie has died," emphasizing the physical resemblance between the two as much as her participation in the fight against ISIS. This was condemned by supporters of the Kurdish cause including other fighters.

=== Reactions and accusations of sexism ===
The media's treatment of Antar as a person was seen as demeaning by many Kurdish activists, especially given her feminist leanings. Choman Kanaani, an activist and Kurdish fighter who repudiated the Western media's treatment of Antar, told the BBC that, "The entire philosophy of YPJ is to fight sexism and prevent using women as a sexual object". He added:

We want to give women their rightful place in society and for them to own their own destinies. Viyan died for these ideals. In the media, no-one talked about the ideals for which she gave her life, nor what Viyan achieved for women in Rojava in the past years when she joined YPG.

== Death ==
On 30 August 2016, three ISIS suicide bombers drove cars filled with explosives towards the Kurdish front line. Antar and other YPJ fighters destroyed two of the cars but the third detonated close to Antar, killing her. Her death was announced on Facebook on 31 August, saying she was "martyred in battle against Daesh [ISIS]".

== See also ==
- Jineology
- Rojava
- Women's Protection Units
