= Mihemed Şêxo =

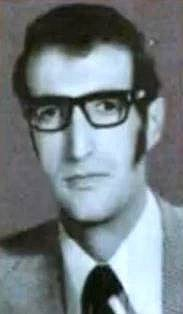
- Mihemed Şêxo
- Born: Mihemed Şêxmûs Salih; 1948; Qamişlo, Second Syrian Republic
- Died: 1989 (age 41); Qamişlo, Syria

Mihemed Şêxmûs Salih (Sorani Kurdish: محەممەد شێخۆ) better known as Mihemed Şêxo, was one of the most important Kurdish folk singers. With his sentimental, traditional and often political lyrics he created great Kurdish music like few before him. His work is still well-known and listened to today.

== Biography ==
=== Childhood and Youth ===
The Kurdish singer Mihemed Salih Şêxmûs was born 1948 in Qamishlo, a city in Syria's northern region which is called Western Kurdistan by Kurds. He was from a poor family and had to work in agriculture. In his early childhood he plowed in the farm of his uncle, to support his family financially. Because of lack of money Mihemed Şêxo could go to school only up to the sixth class. Among his teachers, he was considered a pious intelligent boy. Subsequently, he moved with his family to the city where he continued to work. In 1965, he was able to attend a middle school. Şêxo there was one of the best students of his school. But again, because of financial problems he ended his academic career after the ninth grade. The young student especially was interested in the music, so he admired Kurdish musician. The music of the Kurdish-Armenian singer Aram Tigran aroused a special sympathy for him. With 19 years Mihemed Şêxo learned to play the hand Tembûr, which is a major in the Kurdish music stringed instrument to play. Often, the young talented artist had performed at weddings.

=== Exile in Lebanon ===
In 1969 Mihemed Şêxo emigrated to Lebanon. In the Lebanese capital Beirut he began to study music. Influenced by his patriotic stance he mainly made music in the Kurdish language. In Lebanon, his talent fascinated dozens of people. Although there were multiple offers for him to participate in well-known groups, however, he decided to return to his home.

=== Politically motivated reprisals ===
As Mihemed Şêxo published songs written in Kurdish, which found wide acceptance in the Kurdish society, he was cautioned for his works by the Syrian Baath government. In 1973 he traveled to Iraq to develop his musical talent. There he played Kurdish songs on a local radio. Despite political reprisals, he moved back to his hometown. He brought out a cassette titled "Ay Gewere", whereby he again won the heart of the Kurdish people. During this time, Mihemed Şêxo was more and more interested in the Kurdish history. From then on he began to sing his songs in his home country of unfulfilled longing. Several times the Syrian police arrested him because of his music. Nevertheless, he argued, to produce songs in the Kurdish language. Because of his political identity he had to flee to South Kurdistan, where he admired the resistance of Mela Mistefa Barzanî. As Barzanî fled to Iran, Şêxo decided to follow him. Allegedly he has lived in Gonbad Kavus. In Iran he became acquainted with Persian and Arabic as a teachers taught in schools. He also married a Kurdish woman.

The Arabic music aroused curiosity in him. Influenced by Arabic music, he expanded his musical skills. He wanted to publish his songs free on Kurdish exactly like other famous Arab singers. After the newly formed Iranian regime sit up a policy of assimilation of the Kurdish population, Iranian security forces arrested him. Şêxo went into prison but continued to write political lyrics about his home, which were mainly about the oppression of the Kurdish people.

In 1983 Mihemed Şêxo returned to Syria. Meanwhile, he was a very important Kurdish singer in Western Kurdistan. There was hardly anyone in the west of Kurdistan, who did not know his music. At that time he had already brought 14 music cassettes on the market, which had sold quickly. But his music also found encouragement in other parts of Kurdistan. In the following years Mihemed Şêxo performed at several concerts and continued to write new texts.

== Death and burial ==
In 1989, on 9 March the Kurdish singer died after three days of illness. His death caused great sorrow among the Kurds. Within two hours, more than 70,000 Kurds gathered in his hometown Qamishli to accompany to Şêxo his last honor.

== Post humanum ==
Even today, the music of Mihemed Şêxo plays a special role in the Kurdish history. Many artists make music based on his style. His folk elements of music and often political lyrics made him a special person. Songs like "Ay Le Gule" or "Nesrîn" are still often played Kurdish music channels.

== Sources ==
=== External links ===
- Kurdishmusic.eu: Some works of Mihemed Şêxo
- Kurdishrights.org: Mihemed Şexo – a Kurdish Legend
- Özgür Gündem: Gulê’nin özlediği bülbül: Mihemed Şêxo (Turkish)
- DieKurden.de: Im Gedenken an den kurdischen Sänger Mihemed Şêxo (German)
