= Qamishli =

City in northeastern Syria

Qamishli القامشلي Qamişlo
- City
- Location of Qamishli in Syria
- Coordinates: 37°03′17″N 41°13′41″E
- Country: Syria
- Governorate: Al-Hasakah
- District: Qamishli
- Subdistrict: Qamishli
- Established: 1926
- Elevation: 455 m (1,493 ft)

Population (2004)
  - Total: 184,231
- Time zone: UTC+2 (EET)
  - Summer (DST): UTC+3 (EEST)
- Area code: +963 52
- Geocode: C4564

Qamishli (Note: Also known as Al-Qamishli, Kamishli, Kamishly, Qamishlo or Zalin (Arabic: ٱلْقَامِشْلِي, romanized: al-Qāmišlī; Kurdish: قامیشلۆ, romanized: Qamişlo; Syriac: ܩܡܫܠܝ or Syriac: ܩܡܫܠܐ, romanized: Qamishlo; Classical Syriac: ܒܝܬ ܙܠܝ̈ܢ, romanized: Bēṯ Zālīn, lit. 'House of Reeds')) is a city in northeastern Syria on the Syria–Turkey border, adjoining the city of Nusaybin in Turkey. The Jaghjagh River flows through the city. With a 2004 census population of 184,231, it is the ninth most-populous city in Syria and the second-largest in Al-Hasakah Governorate after Al-Hasakah. Qamishli has traditionally been a Christian Assyrian majority city, but is now predominantly populated by Kurds with large numbers of Arabs and Assyrians and a smaller number of Armenians. It is 680 kilometres (420 mi) northeast of Damascus.

The city is the administrative capital of the Qamishli District in Al-Hasakah Governorate, and the administrative center of Qamishli Subdistrict, consisting of 92 localities with a combined population of 232,095 in 2004. Qamishli was the de facto capital of the DAANES, until it was moved to Ayn Issa.

== Etymology ==
The city was initially a small village inhabited by Assyrians called ܒܝܬ ܙܠܝ̈ܢ (Bēṯ Zālīn), meaning "House of Reeds". The modern name is the Turkish calque of this name; kamış means "reed" and -lı suffix denotes "place with" in Turkish.

== History ==
The city was established in the 1920s by Assyrians escaping the Assyrian genocide who fled from northwestern Iran and southern Turkey. They built a small town under the French Mandate which they initially called Bet-Zalin. In 1926, it was renamed Qamishli and served as a station on the Taurus railway. One of the funders of the early development of the city was Masoud Asfar, an Assyrian who survived the Massacres of Diyarbakır (1895) as a young child. Masoud, along with stepbrother, whose last name was Najjar, established the Asfar & Najjar Corporation, a company that produced wheat in Qamishli. Throughout the 1920s–1940s, the Asfar & Najjar Corporation funded hospitals, Assyrian schools, and churches throughout the city. At the same time, many Armenians and Assyrians, fleeing persecution in Iraq and Turkey, moved into the region. This was followed by the emigration of Kurds from Turkey, most of whom settled in the countryside and then began to move to the city. However, in the 1960s and until the late 1970s, when Assyrians still constituted two-thirds of the city's population, the government of the Arab Socialist Ba'ath Party – Syria Region actively confiscated Assyrian farms, lands, and areas, causing an Assyrian exodus.

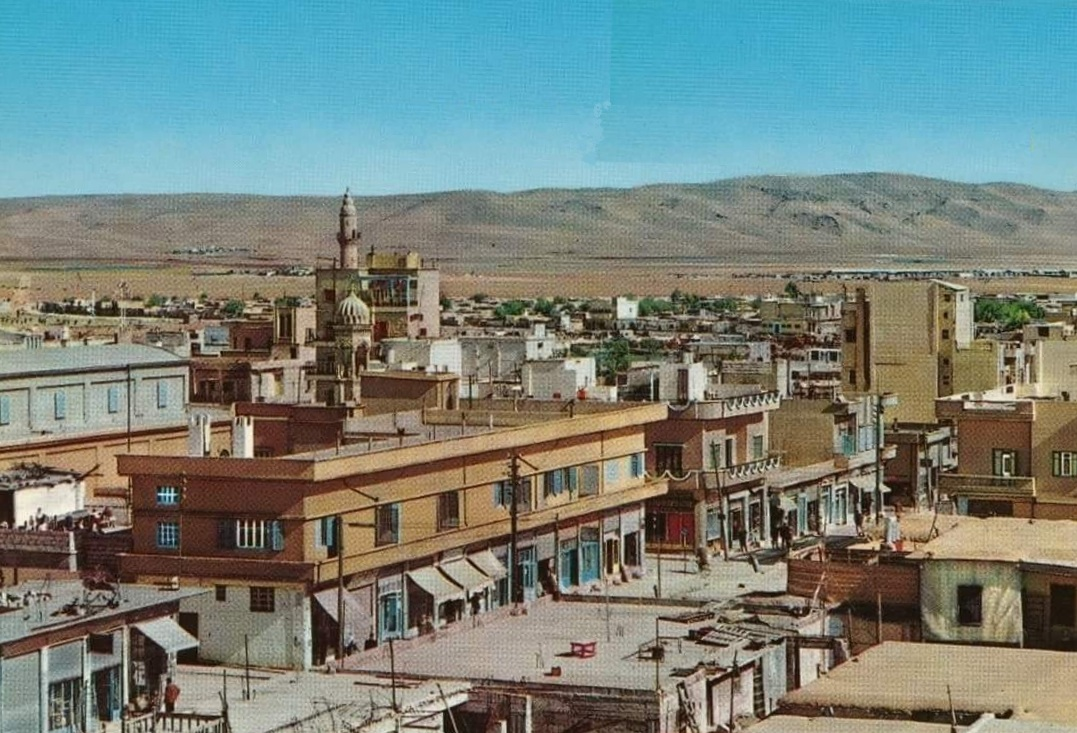
Qamishli in 1964

Qamishli is considered a center for both the Kurdish and the Assyrian ethnic groups in Syria. It was heavily settled by refugees from the Assyrian genocide. Assyrians were the majority in the city until the 1970s, when Kurds from the surrounding countryside moved into the city in numbers. Qamishli is renowned for its large Christmas parade, and Newroz and Kha b-Nisan festivals.

=== 21st century ===
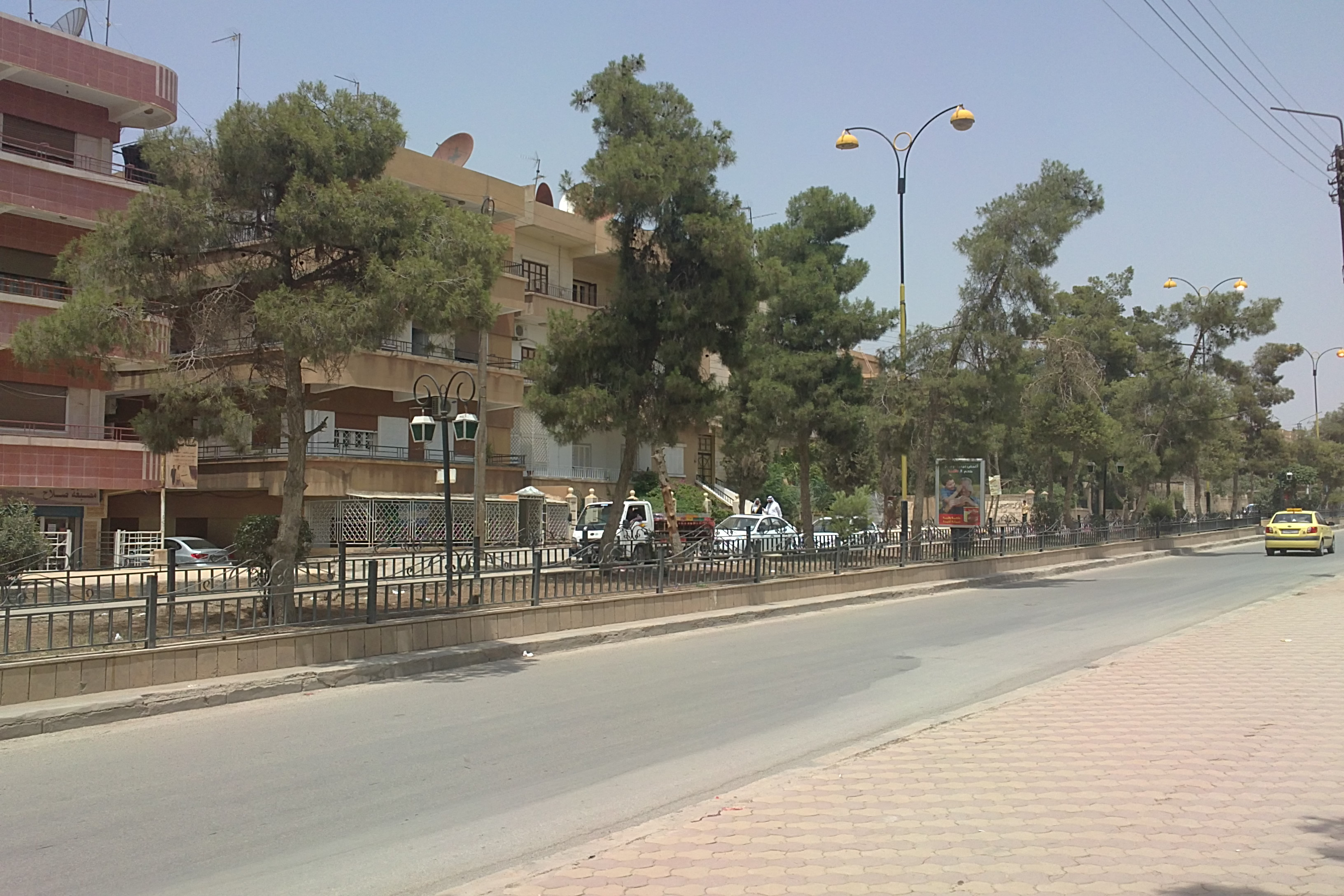
The President's street

In March 2004, during a chaotic soccer match, the Qamishli riots began when visiting Arab fans from Deir ez-Zor started praising Saddam Hussein to taunt the Kurdish home fans. The riot expanded out of the stadium and weapons were used against people of Kurdish background. In the aftermath, at least 30 Kurds were killed as the Syrian security services took over the city.

In June 2005, thousands of Kurds demonstrated in Qamishli to protest the assassination of Sheikh Khaznawi, a Kurdish cleric in Syria, resulting in the death of one policeman and injury to four Kurdish civilians.

In March 2008, according to Human Rights Watch, three more Kurds were killed when Syrian security forces opened fire on people celebrating the spring festival of Newroz.

=== Syrian Civil War and after the conflict ===
2015 division of the city

With the civil war and the Rojava conflict from 2011, the city grew into a major political role, being the de facto capital of the DAANES. Part of the city, as well as an area to the south which includes Qamishli Airport, remained under the administration of the Syrian government until the rebel offensive in December 2024. Unlike many Syrian cities, Qamishli has not seen large-scale fighting during the war, although it has been attacked by unknown perpetrators in 2015 and by Islamic State in 2016, as well as brief skirmishes between DAANES and Syrian forces in 2016 and 2018. Qamishli is home to Chirkin prison, which houses detained Islamic State militants.

On 17 August 2020, Syrian forces reportedly clashed with US troops near Qamishli, which resulted in the death of one Syrian. Two other Syrian soldiers were said to have been injured during the clash, state media added.

In 2022, the Syrian government remained in control of a large part of the city centre as well as a substantial rural area to the south, including the airport, the border crossing, various government buildings, and many residential neighbourhoods. The government still organised the production and the distribution of the harvest in the southern countryside, and organised flights between Qamishli and other Syrian cities, as well as Beirut. However, most of the city was under the administration of the DAANES.

The city came fully under Kurdish forces control in December 2024, when Ba'athist Syrian forces handed over control with little fighting.

Following the 2026 northeastern Syria offensive, the Syrian transitional government forces entered the city on 3 February as part of a ceasefire agreement.

On 4 March 2026, a stray Iranian ballistic missile originally headed for Turkey impacted a field in Qamishli, and failed to explode.

== Climate ==
The Köppen climate classification subtype for this climate is "Csa" (Mediterranean climate; dry-summer subtropical climate). The summers tend to be dry and warm, with July being the hottest month of the year, while the winters are usually cold and wet, with January being the coldest month and having an average of 11 days of rain. In total, around 53 days of rain occur every year.

Climate data for Qamishli (1991–2020, extremes 1952–present)
Month	Jan	Feb	Mar	Apr	May	Jun	Jul	Aug	Sep	Oct	Nov	Dec	Year
Record high °C (°F)	23.6 (74.5)	24.5 (76.1)	32.0 (89.6)	37.4 (99.3)	41.0 (105.8)	46.0 (114.8)	48.5 (119.3)	47.3 (117.1)	45.0 (113.0)	38.6 (101.5)	29.8 (85.6)	27.4 (81.3)	48.5 (119.3)
Mean daily maximum °C (°F)	11.3 (52.3)	13.1 (55.6)	17.4 (63.3)	22.9 (73.2)	30.0 (86.0)	37.0 (98.6)	40.6 (105.1)	40.2 (104.4)	35.3 (95.5)	28.4 (83.1)	19.6 (67.3)	13.2 (55.8)	25.7 (78.3)
Mean daily minimum °C (°F)	3.3 (37.9)	4.1 (39.4)	7.1 (44.8)	10.9 (51.6)	15.9 (60.6)	21.3 (70.3)	24.5 (76.1)	24.1 (75.4)	20.1 (68.2)	15.8 (60.4)	9.1 (48.4)	5.0 (41.0)	13.4 (56.1)
Record low °C (°F)	−11.3 (11.7)	−9.5 (14.9)	−6.7 (19.9)	−2.9 (26.8)	4.6 (40.3)	10.0 (50.0)	15.3 (59.5)	15.8 (60.4)	9.8 (49.6)	1.2 (34.2)	−3.0 (26.6)	−6.7 (19.9)	−11.3 (11.7)
Average precipitation mm (inches)	66.0 (2.60)	59.0 (2.32)	55.2 (2.17)	46.7 (1.84)	22.4 (0.88)	2.5 (0.10)	0.6 (0.02)	0.2 (0.01)	1.3 (0.05)	18.8 (0.74)	36.8 (1.45)	59.9 (2.36)	361.1 (14.22)
Average precipitation days (≥ 1.0 mm)	8.3	7.8	7.7	6.4	3.8	0.4	0.1	0.1	0.4	2.9	4.0	6.8	48.0
Average relative humidity (%)	71	68	64	60	47	29	24	24	27	39	57	70	48
Mean monthly sunshine hours	148.8	154.0	204.6	222.0	288.3	339.0	356.5	350.3	312.0	254.2	192.0	148.8	2,970.5
Mean daily sunshine hours	4.8	5.5	6.6	7.4	9.3	11.3	11.5	11.3	10.4	8.2	6.4	4.8	8.1
Source 1: NOAA (sun 1961–1990)
Source 2: Deutscher Wetterdienst (humidity, 1974–1978), Meteo Climat (record highs and lows)

== Demographics ==
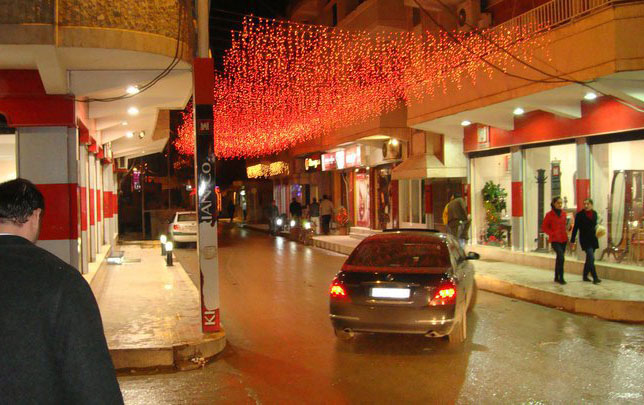
Miami Street in Al-Wusta neighborhood during Christmas.

Historical population
Year	Pop.	±%
1981	92,990	—
1994	144,286	+55.2%
2004	184,231	+27.7%

In 1939, French mandate authorities reported the following population numbers for different ethnic/religious groups in Qamishli city centre.

Arabs	Kurds	Assyrians	Armenians
7990	5892	14,140	3500

Qamishli is an ethnically mixed city. Kurds make up a majority of the city's population, which also has many Arabs, Assyrians, (Note: See also the article Terms for Syriac Christians) and Armenians.

== Religion ==
=== Muslims ===
More than 80% of Qamishli's inhabitants are Sunni Muslims. They are mainly Kurds, followed by Arabs.

=== Christians ===
The city is considered to be a Christian center in Syria, and was a Christian-majority city for much of its history.

In the 1930s it is estimated that out of the town's population of 23,000 individuals, 20,000 of those were Christians.

Before the civil war, the Christian population of Qamishli was about 40,000, of whom 25,000 belonged to the Syriac Orthodox Church, the biggest church in the city. As of 2014 it was believed that half of all Christians had left the city.

Once a Christian-majority city, the rural migration to Qamishli has increased the Kurdish population of the city. In addition, since the PYD militia took control of the city in 2012 they carried out a Kurdification process touching all aspects of life, starting by changing the name of the city to Qamishlo, to cultural and social aspects of the city. The Christian and Arab population in the city were fiercely opposed to the PYD rule. Half the Christian population left by 2017 although no fighting happened in the city.

=== Churches in the city ===
- Syriac Orthodox Church of Saint Jacob of Nisibis (كنيسة القديس مار يعقوب النصيبيني للسريان الأرثوذكس)
- Syriac Orthodox Church of Our Lady (كنيسة السيده العذراء للسريان الأرثوذكس)
- Syriac Orthodox Church of Saint Ephrem the Syrian (كنيسة مار افرام السرياني للسريان الأرثوذكس)
- Syriac Orthodox Church of Saint Quriaqos (كنيسة مار قرياقوس للسريان الأرثوذكس)
- Syriac Catholic Church of Saint Peter and Saint Paul (كنيسة القديسين مار بطرس وبولس للسريان الكاثوليك)
- Assyrian Church of Saint George (كنيسة مار جرجس للآشوريين)
- Assyrian Church of Saint Ephrem (كنيسة مار أفرام للآشوريين)
- Chaldean Catholic Church of Saint Jacob of Nisibis (كنيسة القديس مار يعقوب النصيبيني للكلدان الكاثوليك)
- Armenian Orthodox Church of Saint Hagop (كنيسة القديس هاكوب الأرمن الأورثوذكس)
- Armenian Catholic Church of Saint Joseph (كنيسة مار يوسف الأرمن الكاثوليك)
- National Evangelical Presbyterian Church (الكنيسة الأنجيلية المشيخية الوطنية)

=== Jews ===
Historically, Qamishli was also home to a significant Jewish community. The origin of the Jews of Qamishli (unlike the Jews of Damascus and Aleppo who are a mixture of Sephardi Jews and Musta'arabi Jews) is the adjoining city of Nusaybin, on the other side of the Turkish-Syrian border. As after the foundation of Turkey in 1923, the major economic hubs were allocated to Turkey, the French Mandate authorities deemed it necessary to encourage the settlement or foundation of new villages and towns in the region. The current town was founded in 1926 by the French Mandate, which following encouraged the settlement of the population in Nusaybin, which is located just across the border. Within a few years, Qamishli was more populous than Nusaybin. The major part of the Christian, and also of the Jewish population from Nusaybin moved to Qamsihli. In the 1930s the Jewish population of Qamishli numbered 3,000. After the escalation of the Israeli–Palestinian conflict in 1947, the situation of the Jews of Qamishli deteriorated. The exodus of Jews from Syria peaked due to violence, such as the 1947 anti-Jewish riots in Aleppo. By 1963, the community had dwindled to 800, and after the Six-Day War it went down further to 150, of whom no one remain today.

== Neighborhoods ==
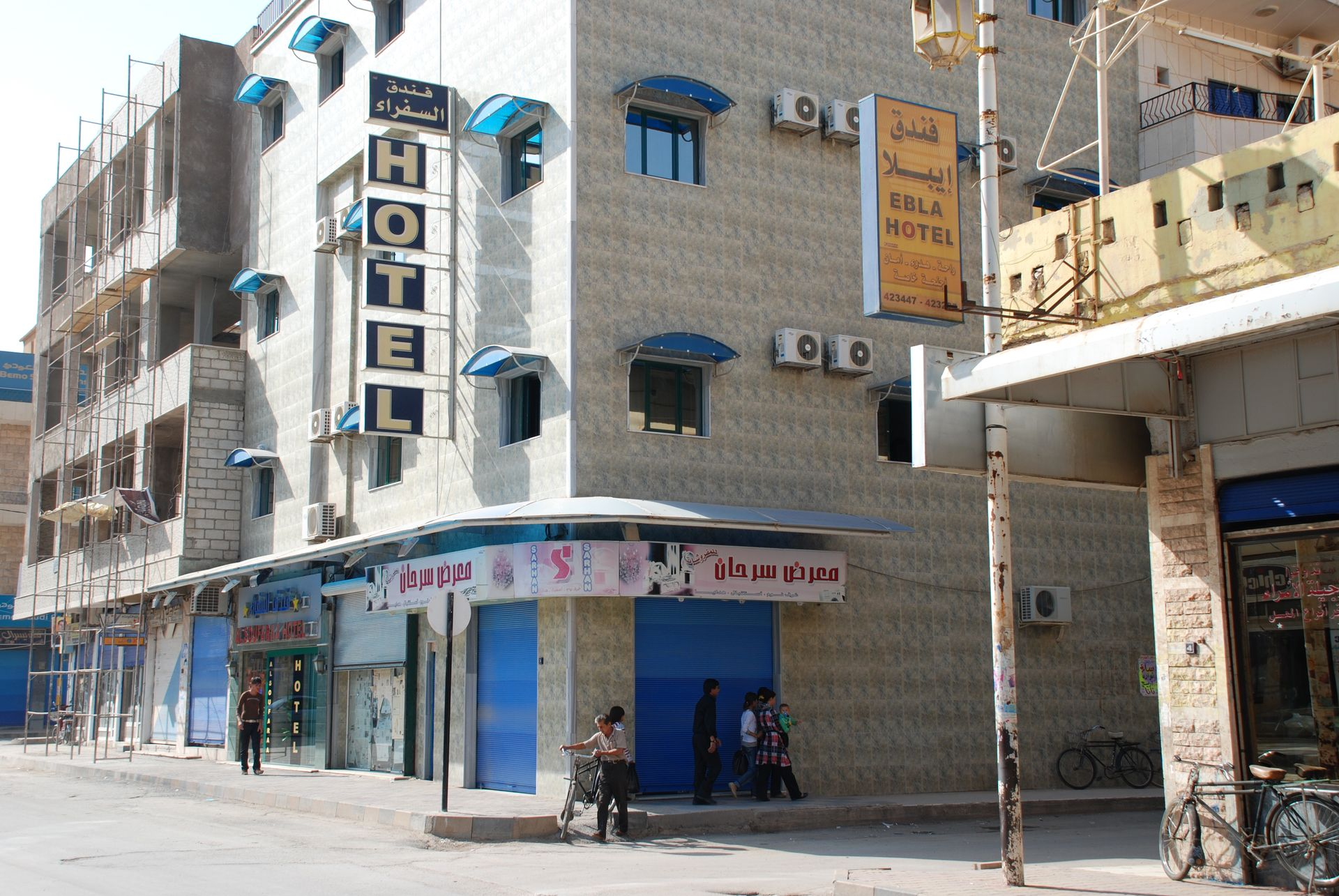
Hotels in Qamishli

Qamishli is divided into several districts, which are further divided into neighborhoods.

This is a list of the neighborhoods of Qamishli.

- Al-Zahra (Al-Wusta)
- Al-Qusour
- Al-Muwazafin
- Qudour Bek
- Al-Gharbiyah
- Corniche
- Al-Arbawiyah
- Al-Ashouriyin (Assyrian)
- Al-Siryan (Syriac)
- Al-Bashiriyah
- Tay
- Al-Thawra
- Al-Golan (Berkila)
- Qanat al-Suways
- Al-Antariyah
- Maysaloun
- Al-Hilaliyah
- Jurnak
- Alaiya (Hattin)
- Mahmakiyah
- Jumaayah
- Halko

== Transportation ==
Qamishli Airport was closed to civilians in October 2015, but later reopened. As of October 2026, it is inactive awaiting renovation works.

== Media and education ==
The Kurdish-language newspaper Nu Dem has its headquarters in Qamishli.

While prior to the Rojava conflict, there had been no institution of higher education in northeastern Syria, in September 2014 the Mesopotamian Social Sciences Academy started teaching. Following the University of Afrin, in July 2016 the Jazira Canton's Board of Education officially established the second Syrian Kurdish university in Qamishli. The University of Rojava initially comprised four faculties: Medicine, Engineering, Sciences, and Arts and Humanities. Programs taught include health, oil, computer and agricultural engineering, physics, chemistry, history, psychology, geography, mathematics, primary school teaching, and Kurdish literature.

== Sports ==
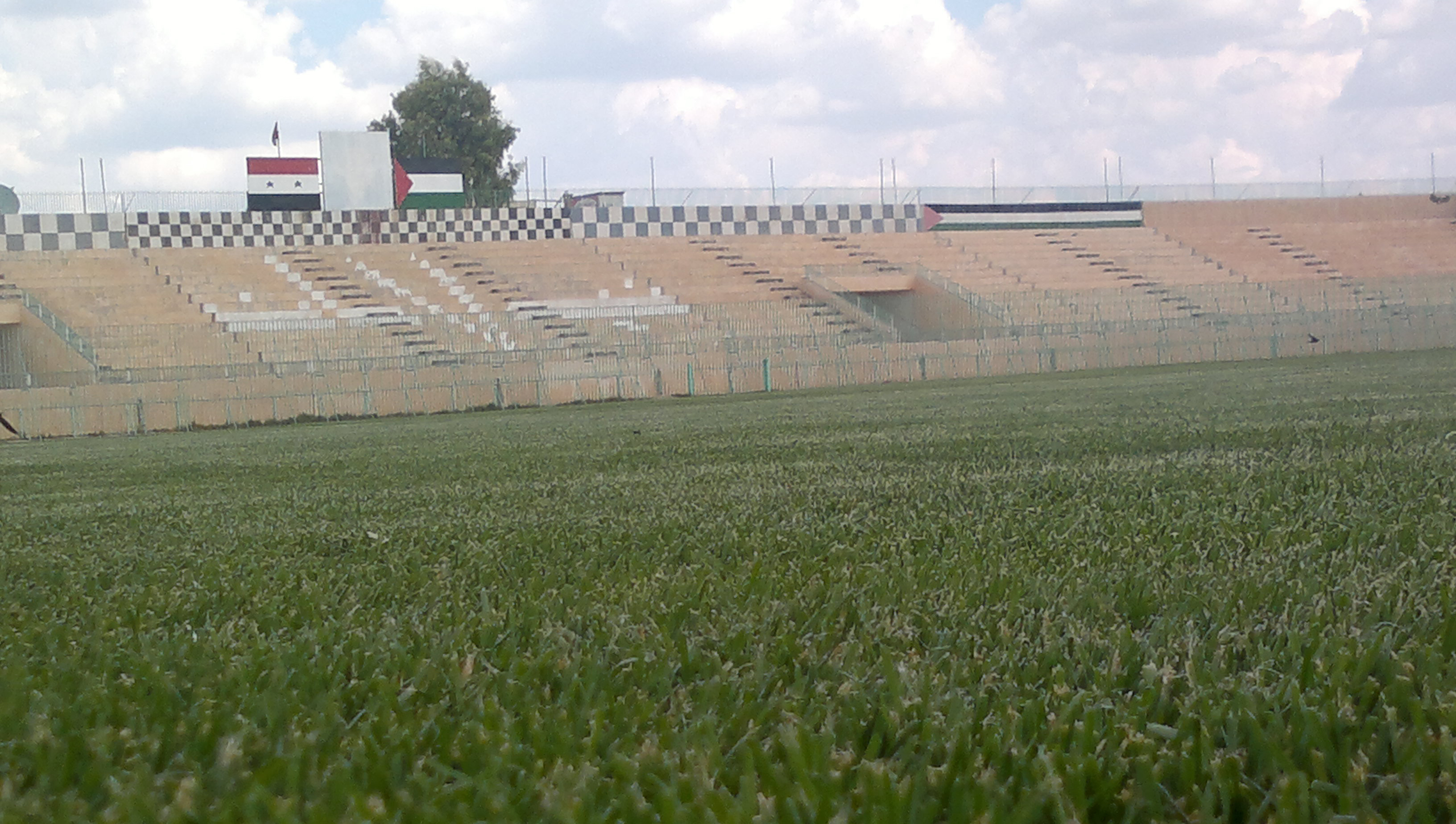
7 April Stadium

Al-Jihad SC is the largest football club in the city and plays at 7 April Stadium.

== Notable people ==
- Aram Tigran, singer
- Arsen Grigoryan, singer
- Viyan Antar, Kurdish (YPJ) fighter
- Ciwan Haco, singer
- Sanharib Malki, footballer
- Gregorius Yohanna Ibrahim, Syriac Orthodox Archbishop of Aleppo
- Ignatius Aphrem II, Patriarch of the Syriac Orthodox Church
- Gabriel Asaad, Assyrian Musician
- Salim Barakat, novelist and poet
- Agop Donabidian, football coach and former player
- Mihemed Şêxo, kurdish folk singer
- Noureddin Issa Ahmed, Governor of Hasakah (2026-present)

== See also ==
- Armenian Catholic Eparchy of Qamishli
- Assyrians in Syria
- Kurds in Syria
