= Qamishli Subdistrict =

Qamishli Subdistrict ناحية مركز القامشلي Nahiye Qamişlo
- Subdistrict
- Location of Qamishli Subdistrict within al-Hasakah Governorate

- Location in Syria
- Coordinates (Qamishli): 36.9675°N 41.2231°E
- Country: Syria
- Governorate: al-Hasakah
- District: Qamishli
- Seat: Qamishli

Area
  - Total: 637.27 km^{2} (246.05 sq mi)

Population (2004)
  - Total: 232,095
  - Density: 364.20/km^{2} (943.28/sq mi)
- Geocode: SY080200

Qamishli Subdistrict (Arabic: ناحية مركز القامشلي; Kurdish: Nahiye Qamişlo) is a subdistrict of Qamishli District in northeastern al-Hasakah Governorate, northeastern Syria. Administrative centre is the city of Qamishli.

At the 2004 census, the subdistrict had a population of 232,095.

== Cities, towns and villages ==
Cities, towns and villages of Qamishli Subdistrict
PCode	Name	Population
C4564	Qamishli	184,231
—N/a	Jimaayah	2,559
—N/a	Hanadi	2,462
C4575	Umm al-Fursan	2,254
C4567	Kherbet Amu	1,997
C4569	Hamou	1,965
C4542	Abu Thweil	1,680
C4543	Abu Rasin Qamishli	1,477
C4573	Tal Odeh Qamishli	1,423
C4560	Rehiyeh	1,299
—N/a	Al-Ayn	1,230
—N/a	Zebian Qamishli	1,194
C4572	Al-Qusayr	1,185
C4531	Tal Elthahab Qamishli	1,086
—N/a	Al-Arbain Aghani	1,049
C4570	Safieh Qamishli	994
C4536	Kita	889
C4539	Dankhiyeh Kabir	870
C4544	Dalawiya Kabir	775
—N/a	Qatana	764
C4525	Shamasiyeh	716
C4574	Bawe Kabir	698
—N/a	Al-Bajariyah	676
C4561	Tal Eid	655
—N/a	?	623
—N/a	?	616
C4555	Tartab	606
C4576	Mluk Sray	595
C4526	Hatemiyeh	586
C4571	Tall Sattih Gharbi	568
—N/a	Nimah	567
C4546	Takht Elshmasiyeh	541
—N/a	?	520
C4551	Akula Qamishli	516
C4565	Razaza	480
C4582	Hayahi	466
C4541	Salhiyeh	461
—N/a	?	441
—N/a	?	426
—N/a	Hara	409
C4557	Buladiyeh	383
—N/a	Amir	335
C4538	Rikabiyeh	313
—N/a	?	310
C4583	Ghaybi	296
C4530	Dudan	288
C4554	Jadu	278
C4534	Tall Faris	276
C4558	Kherbet Daher	272
—N/a	?	271
C4566	Jermez	270
C4547	Umm Jafar Fawqani Kabir	263
C4550	Tal Sheer Qamishli	260
C4580	Wattutiyeh	242
C4549	Dalali	236
C4553	Rejm	233
—N/a	Al-Haram	231
C4532	Rashwaniyeh	210
C4577	Haram Sheikho	209
—N/a	Al-Maha	209
—N/a	Tal Aswad	208
—N/a	?	198
—N/a	Karak	191
C4568	Sharq	188
—N/a	?	183
C4563	Kherbet Antar	174
C4552	Abu Jala	170
C4562	Upper Barku	170
C4528	Ath-Thawrah	161
C4579	Maryuza	157
C4535	Kherbet Elqdi	156
—N/a	?	156
C4524	Tuffahiyeh	154
C4533	Tal Teir	153
—N/a	?	151
—N/a	Awar	146
—N/a	?	145
C4559	Tal Elthum	139
C4529	Suweidiyah Harb	128
C4581	Naqara	120
C4527	Suweidiyah Kabir	119
—N/a	?	119
C4556	Tal Eltiben	107
—N/a	?	105
C4537	Nejem	97
C4545	Kherbet Tami	81
C4540	Tal Kif Anz	80
—N/a	?	62
—N/a	?	55
C4578	Haram Hassan	53
C4548	Jokha	18
—N/a	Kherbet Khaled	17
