= Arsen Grigoryan (singer, born 1968) =

Arsen Grigoryan Mro
- Born: December 7, 1968 (age 56); Qamishli, Syria
- Occupation: Singer
- Years active: 1987–present

Arsen Hovsepi Grigoryan (Armenian: Արսեն Հովսեփի Գրիգորյան; born 7 December 1968), is a Syrian-born Armenian traditional songs performer. He was born in 1968 in the city of Qamishli at the northeast of Syria.

Grigoryan moved to Yerevan in 1987 to pursue his studies in the Komitas State Conservatory of Yerevan. Since then, he has lived in Armenia. In 2014, he was awarded with the title of Honored Artist of Armenia.
