= Nûdem =

Nûdem ("New Time") is a fortnightly Kurdish language newspaper headquartered in Qamishli, Syria. The newspaper, the first Kurdish-language newspaper in Syria, began in May 2013. At that time it had a circulation of 3,000. As of October 2013, Qadir Agid is the editor in chief and Massoud Hamid is the manager.
