= University of Afrin =

University in Afrin, Syria

Afrin University
- Zanîngeha Efrînê
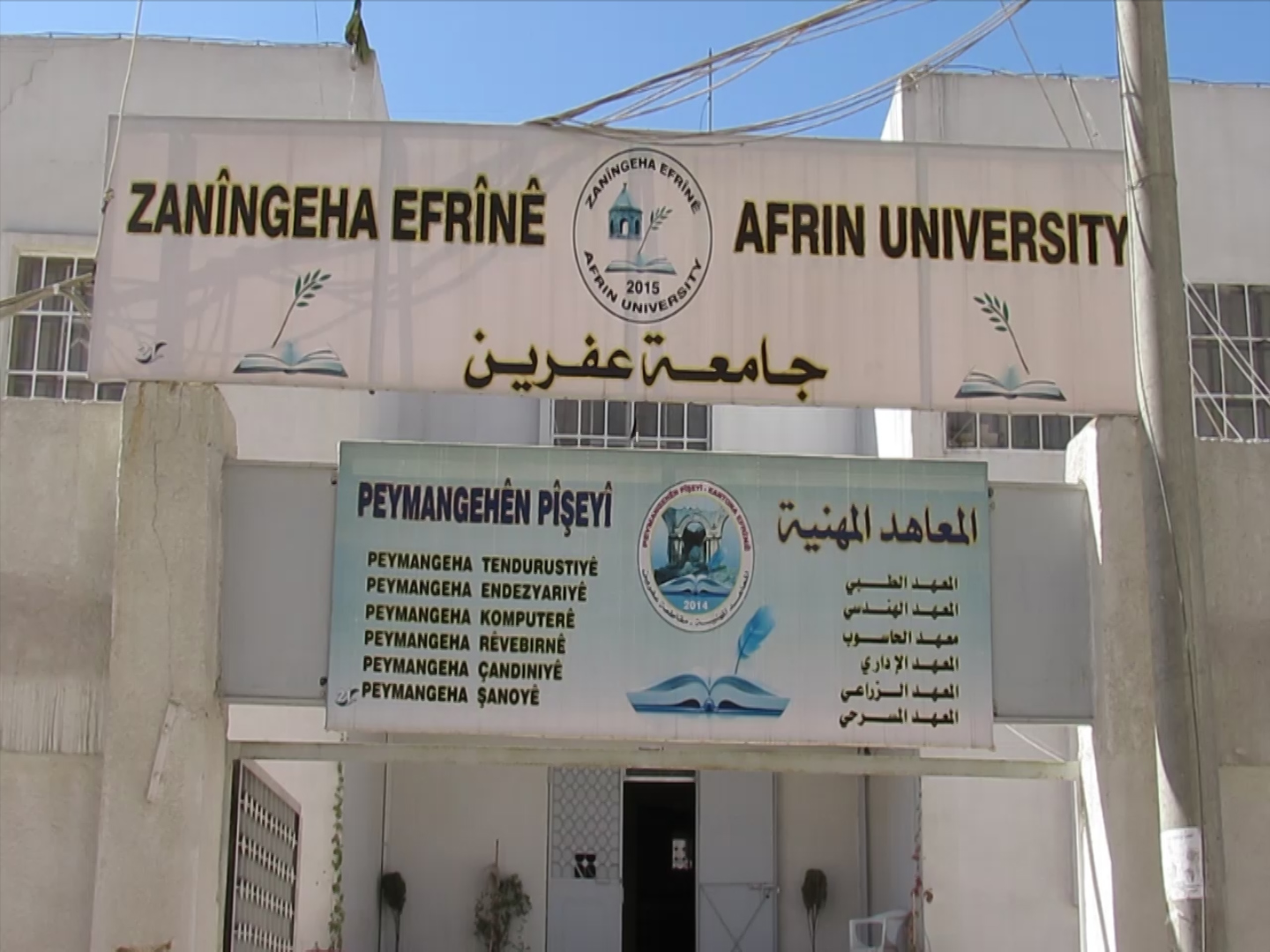
- Active: 26 July 2016–January 2018

Afrin University (Kurdish: Zanîngeha Efrînê) was an unrecognized university in the city of Afrin in northern Syria, when Afrin was a part of the Autonomous Administration of North and East Syria (AANES). It was the second university to open in the AANES (after the Mesopotamian Social Sciences Academy which opened ten months before) and the first university to open in the Afrin District.

It opened on 26 July 2015 to an intake of students said to be anywhere from 250 to 850. In August of the same year it had 22 professors (who were required to have a master's degree or doctorate) on their staff. Six additional labs (for engineering and medicine) opened at the start of the new term. In August it ran programs in literature (including in Kurmanji), journalism, engineering, medicine, and economics. It included institutes for medicine, topographic engineering, music, theatre, business administration and the Kurdish language. The university had a five-year engineering program and four-year programs for all other specializations; and a two-tier fee system for local and international students, with price primarily dependent on the course of study chosen.

The university was shut down after the beginning of the Turkish military operation in Afrin in January 2018, and students were transferred to the University of Rojava in Qamishli. During the subsequent Turkish occupation, Ahrar al-Sharqiya (a faction of the Syrian National Army) arrested Dr Abdul Majeed Izzat Sheikho, the dean of Kurdish literature at the University of Afrin.

== See also ==
- Rojava University
- Mesopotamian Social Sciences Academy
