= Female Protection Forces of the Land Between Two Rivers =

Female armed forces unit

The Female Protection Forces of the Land Between Two Rivers was a small female battalion in Syria. Its members were trained in the north-eastern town of Al-Qahtaniyeh in Syria and were one of many small militia groups fighting ISIS in Syria. It was made up of Syriac Christian women.

== Name ==
The "Two Rivers" in the battalion's name refer to the Tigris and the Euphrates.

== Context ==
During the Syrian Civil War, Christians, who make up over 10% of the Syrian population, were heavily persecuted under the Islamic State. Thousands had been driven out of their homes, and in areas seized by the jihadists, Christians had been given the choice to either convert to Islam, pay a religious levy, or be executed.
