= Al-Qahtaniyah Subdistrict =

Al-Qahtaniyah Subdistrict ناحية القحطانية
- Subdistrict
- Location of Al-Qahtaniyah Subdistrict within al-Hasakah Governorate

- Location in Syria
- Coordinates (al-Qahtaniyah): 36.9181°N 41.57°E
- Country: Syria
- Governorate: al-Hasakah
- District: Qamishli
- Seat: al-Qahtaniyah

Area
  - Total: 872.67 km^{2} (336.94 sq mi)

Population (2004)
  - Total: 65,685
  - Density: 75.269/km^{2} (194.95/sq mi)
- Geocode: SY080203

Al-Qahtaniyah Subdistrict (Arabic: ناحية القحطانية) is a subdistrict of Qamishli District in northeastern al-Hasakah Governorate, northeastern Syria. The administrative centre is the town of al-Qahtaniyah.

At the 2004 census, the subdistrict had a population of 65,685.

== Cities, towns and villages ==
Cities, towns and villages of al-Qahtaniyah Subdistrict
PCode	Name	Population
C4751	al-Qahtaniyah	16,946
C4753	al-Tannuriyah	2,771
C4780	al-Manathirah	2,348
C4748	Khweitleh Eljawaleh	1,845
C4768	Hilweh	1,774
C4755	Karimeh	1,515
—N/a	Abu Farah	1,306
C4792	Tell Brie - Krie Brie	1,291
C4745	Khazneh Kabira	1,232
—N/a	al-Haramun	1,060
—N/a	?	1,054
C4775	Shil	1,026
C4747	Kherbet Elthibeh Qahtaniyah	923
—N/a	?	835
C4750	Waara	754
C4784	Abtak Fawqani Hreith	724
C4773	Siha Jadida Tahtani	703
—N/a	Hasna	687
C4787	Siha Fawqani	682
C4756	Bayandur	658
C4754	Abu Ghadir	646
—N/a	al-Hadar	611
—N/a	al-Murj Qahtaniyah	610
—N/a	?	609
C4788	Tal Odeh Qahtaniyah	604
—N/a	?	601
—N/a	Fares Kabir	596
C4789	Bsheiriyeh Qahtaniyah	580
C4800	Msheirfeh Qahtaniyah	576
—N/a	?	573
—N/a	?	569
C4796	Lilan Kabir	508
—N/a	Abu Kabrat Qahtaniyah	507
C4742	Tal Srat	503
—N/a	Tell al-Matar	491
C4799	Qutba Tahtani	489
C4774	Ghariqa Fawqani	487
C4779	Hbeis	483
C4763	Bayaza Kabir	481
—N/a	?	481
C4758	Kharab Elabed	480
—N/a	Saba	477
C4777	Tal Sheer Qahtaniyah	463
C4759	Tal Ziwan	443
—N/a	?	408
C4746	Sofiyeh	404
C4801	Nabbuah	402
C4752	Kherbet Thyabiyeh	399
C4791	Tal Barham	389
—N/a	Umm Kurinat	364
C4793	Araja Gharbia Tahtani	363
—N/a	?	350
—N/a	?	336
C4778	Tal Kharnub	335
C4776	Lower Ghariqa	330
C4772	Alsayed Ali	314
—N/a	al-Bitra Qahtaniyah	310
C4744	al-Aymer	304
—N/a	?	298
C4760	Suqiyeh	279
—N/a	?	277
—N/a	Khariat Qahtaniyah	272
—N/a	al-Walid	271
—N/a	?	264
—N/a	?	255
C4771	Tawil	245
—N/a	?	245
—N/a	?	232
—N/a	Tishrin Qahtaniyah	229
C4769	Mandub	226
C4757	Tell Elsayed	225
—N/a	?	208
C4785	Balij	204
—N/a	Abu Hajira Tahtani	197
—N/a	al-Jabal	189
C4770	Rotan	187
C4743	Bweir Qahtaniyah	181
C4765	Tal Jihad	177
C4781	Shalhumiyeh	171
C4762	Bayaza Saghiratan	169
—N/a	?	168
C4783	Kherbet Elteir Qahtaniyah	163
—N/a	al-Hayra	152
C4764	Um Krein	150
—N/a	?	149
C4782	Tal Khatun Qahtaniyah	140
C4761	Um Jfar	138
—N/a	?	138
—N/a	Abu Hajira Fawqani	138
C4797	Morjana	134
—N/a	?	131
C4794	Mahrakan	122
C4767	Abteik	118
—N/a	?	117
—N/a	?	117
C4790	Safieh Qahtaniyeh	116
—N/a	Thalja	111
—N/a	?	92
C4766	Kuwaitilat al-Sufli	82
C4786	Zorfafa	67
C4798	Malabas	49
C4749	Kherbet Khalil	45
C4795	Qutba	37
