= Tell Hamis =

Tell Hamis تَلّ حَمِيس
- Town
- Location of Tell Hamis in Syria
- Coordinates: 36.7586°N 41.3989°E
- Country: Syria
- Governorate: al-Hasakah
- District: Qamishli
- Subdistrict: Tell Hamis

Population (2004)
  - Total: 5,161
- Time zone: UTC+3 (AST)
- Geocode: C4639

Tell Hamis (Arabic: تَلّ حَمِيس, romanized: Tall Ḥamīs) is a town in northeastern Hasakah Governorate, northeastern Syria. The Wadi Jarrah flows through the town. It is the administrative center of the Tell Hamis Subdistrict, consisting of 129 localities.

At the 2004 census, Tell Hamis had a population of 5,161. The inhabitants of the town are predominantly Arabs.

== Civil war and conflict ==
After falling to the Islamic State, it was retaken by Kurdish YPG forces and allied Arab tribes on February 27, 2015.

In January 2026, Tell Hamis came under the control of forces affiliated with the Syrian transitional government.

== See also ==
- Syrian civil war
