= Qamishli District =

Qamishli District منطقة القامشلي Navçeya Qamişlo
- District
- Location of Qamishli District within al-Hasakah Governorate

- Location in Syria
- Coordinates (Qamishli): 37.05°N 41.22°E
- Country: Syria
- Governorate: al-Hasakah
- Seat: Qamishli
- Subdistricts: 4 nawāḥī

Area
  - Total: 4,043.54 km^{2} (1,561.22 sq mi)

Population (2004)
  - Total: 425,580
  - Density: 105.25/km^{2} (272.59/sq mi)
- Geocode: SY0802

Qamishli District (Arabic: منطقة القامشلي, romanized: manṭiqat al-Qāmišlī; Kurdish: Navçeya Qamişlo) is a district of al-Hasakah Governorate in northeastern Syria. The administrative centre is the city of Qamishli. At the 2004 census, the district had a population of 425,580.

== Subdistricts ==
The district of Qamishli is divided into four subdistricts or nawāḥī (population as of 2004):

Subdistricts of Qamishli District
| PCode | Name | Area | Population | Villages | Seat |
|---|---|---|---|---|---|
| SY080200 | Qamishli Subdistrict | 637.27 km^{2} | 232,095 | 92 | Qamishli |
| SY080201 | Tell Hamis Subdistrict | 1,498.73 km^{2} | 71,699 | 129 | Tell Hamis |
| SY080202 | Amuda Subdistrict | 1,034.86 km^{2} | 56,101 | 103 | Amuda |
| SY080203 | al-Qahtaniyah Subdistrict | 872.67 km^{2} | 65,685 | 103 | al-Qahtaniyah |
