= Amuda Subdistrict =

Amuda Subdistrict ناحية عامودا
- Subdistrict
- Location of Amuda Subdistrict within al-Hasakah Governorate

- Location in Syria
- Coordinates (Amuda): 36°57′15″N 40°54′52″E
- Country: Syria
- Governorate: al-Hasakah
- District: Qamishli
- Seat: Amuda

Area
  - Total: 1,034.86 km^{2} (399.56 sq mi)

Population (2004)
  - Total: 56,101
  - Density: 54.211/km^{2} (140.41/sq mi)
- Geocode: SY080202

Amuda Subdistrict (Arabic: ناحية عامودا) is a subdistrict of Qamishli District in northeastern al-Hasakah Governorate, northeastern Syria. Administrative centre is the town Amuda.

At the 2004 census, the subdistrict had a population of 56,101.

== Cities, towns and villages ==
Cities, towns and villages of Amuda Subdistrict
PCode	Name	Population
C4688	Amuda	26,821
C4722	Raya Gharbi	1,449
C4729	Jaberiyeh Amudeh	934
—N/a	al-Jadidah	850
—N/a	Bahira	802
—N/a	Jul Jamal	700
C4683	Jorhariyeh	690
—N/a	Sabah	687
C4723	Wardiyeh Amudeh	652
—N/a	al-Hannia	650
C4726	Rihaniyet Amuda	638
C4706	Tell Ahmar	590
C4717	Umm Rabee	542
C4719	Jalaq	539
C4684	Tell Khanzir	531
C4721	Rayat Elkhalil	519
—N/a	al-Jum	503
—N/a	Shawala	485
C4690	Fares	460
—N/a	Tiberia	450
—N/a	Tell al-Wafa	445
C4740	Kinda	428
C4693	Tell Habash	418
C4689	Hettin Amuda	407
—N/a	Ghazala Amudeh	399
C4716	Um Enab	365
C4704	Tell Aswad Amudeh	336
C4686	Tell Khaled	335
C4708	Umm al-Aswad Tahtani	334
C4697	Dar	317
C4701	Amara	300
C4738	Qleiah	291
—N/a	?	283
C4730	Bab Elkheir	278
C4694	Tawwar Ilias	273
C4696	Lower Tell Arus	272
C4741	Nif	272
—N/a	Shaykh	269
C4720	Khorzeh	267
C4731	Markab	263
C4724	Raya Qabli	253
C4705	Bardeh	248
—N/a	Abu al-Hul	246
—N/a	Umm al-Banat	234
—N/a	?	232
C4691	Haj Bakari	230
—N/a	Fawwara	229
C4713	Bustan Fawqani	227
C4712	Dikiyeh	226
C4732	Qaber Ali	226
—N/a	?	218
C4699	Talil	206
—N/a	?	204
C4725	Kherbet Elsawda	201
C4702	Bustan Tahtani	201
C4739	Qayrawan Amuda	196
C4687	Abu Khinjar	191
—N/a	Tell al-Mal	190
C4682	Haj Naser	186
C4707	Sardaq	183
—N/a	Jamila	183
C4727	Shajra	182
—N/a	Tabat	180
—N/a	Alia	179
C4692	Hallaba	179
C4695	Tell Arbid	179
C4710	Karawan	177
C4709	Kherbet Ghazal Fawqani	175
—N/a	?	175
—N/a	?	175
—N/a	Kherbet Aziz	170
—N/a	?	170
—N/a	Qahera	169
C4715	Kherbet Sheib Amuda	168
C4698	Hasda Tahtani	164
—N/a	?	164
—N/a	?	161
—N/a	?	155
C4711	Sfira Amuda	153
—N/a	?	152
C4735	Fokhar	151
C4737	Koub	146
—N/a	Milsun	146
—N/a	?	145
—N/a	Adnaniyeh	140
C4733	Mustafa	138
—N/a	?	134
—N/a	?	133
—N/a	?	130
C4718	Sabahiyeh	127
C4728	Deir Mary	123
C4703	Billet Bkara	115
—N/a	?	110
C4685	Hasba	106
—N/a	?	95
C4734	Mashad	75
C4714	Khaled	65
C4700	Tell Eshq	62
—N/a	?	49
C4736	Qadah	39
—N/a	?	38
—N/a	?	36
—N/a	Hadba	17
