= Mehmed Emîn Bozarslan =

Turkish Kurdish writer and translator (1934–2026)

Mehmed Emîn Bozarslan (15 September 1934 – 22 January 2026) was a Turkish-Swedish Kurdish writer and translator. Born in Diyarbakır in south-eastern Turkey, he moved to Sweden as political asylum seeker in 1978, and he lived in Uppsala until his death. The most famous of his early works was Alfabê which was the first ABC-book for Kurdish learning that was published in Turkey in 1968. The books were impounded immediately by a Turkish court. Emin was arrested and jailed under separatism charges. He was released after a while but jailed again on another occasion under the military regime from spring 1971 to summer of 1974. He moved to Sweden as a political asylum seeker in 1978.

Bozarslan died in Uppsala, Sweden on 22 January 2026, at the age of 91.

== Works ==
=== Books ===
1. Alfabê, Istanbul, 64 pp. 1968.
2. Meselokên lawiran. - Borås : Invandrarförlaget, 1981.
3. Meyro : çîrok. - Borås : Invandrarförl., 79 pp., ISBN 91-85242-43-8, 1981.
4. Mîr zoro, Borås : Invandrarförl., 80 pp., 1981.
5. Gurê bilûrvan, Borås : Invandrarförl., 71 pp., ISBN 91-85242-50-0,1982.
6. Kêz Xatûn, Borås : Invandrarförl., 79 pp., ISBN 91-85242-61-6,1982.
7. Serketina miskan, Uppsala : Studieförl., 85 pp., ISBN 91-7382-604-9,1984.
8. Pepûk, Uppsala : Deng Publishers, 70 pp., ISBN 91-7382-618-9,1985.
9. Melayê meshûr, Uppsala: Deng Publishers, 85 pp., ISBN 91-7382-620-0,1986.
10. Serefa ristem keya : pirtûka kurteçîrokan, Uppsala : Deng Publishers, 123 pp.,ISBN 91-88246-03-5,1992.
11. Kemal Paşa weledê kê ye? : meselokên sîyasî, Uppsala : Deng Publishers, 89 pp., ISBN 91-88246-05-1,1993.
12. Çirokên gelî. 1 : Gulî xatûn, Uppsala : Deng Publishers, 88 pp., ISBN 91-88246-10-8, 1997.
13. Çirokên gelî. 2 : Kurê mîrê masîyan, Uppsala : Deng Publishers, 120 pp., ISBN 91-88246-11-6, 1998.

=== Edits ===
1. Jîn : kovara Kurdî-Tirkî : 1918-1919,(Jîn: Kurdish/Turkish Journal), Changing from Arabic script to Latin script by M. Emîn Bozarslan, Uppsala: Deng Publishers, 5 volumes, 1985-1988.
2. Kurdistan : rojnama Kurdî ya pêsîn : 1898-1902,(Kurdistan: The first Kurdish newspaper), Changing from Arabic script to Latin script by M. Emîn Bozarslan. - Uppsala : Deng Publishers, 2 volumes, 1991.
3. Mem û Zîn of Ehmedê Xanî, Changing from Arabic script to Latin script by M. Emîn Bozarslan, Uppsala : Deng Publishers, 703 pp., ISBN 91-88246-07-8,1995.

=== Folklore ===
1. Pêkenokên gelî. vol. 1 : Masîyên bejî, Uppsala : Deng Publishers, 64 pp., ISBN 91-970702-4-6, 1987.
2. Pêkenokên gelî. vol. 2 : Ji dînan dîntir, Uppsala : Deng Publishers, 64 pp., ISBN 91-970702-7-0, 1988.
3. Pêkenokên gelî. vol. 3 : Ilmê tûrik, Uppsala : Deng Publishers, 79 pp., ISBN 91-970702-8-9, 1989.
4. Pêkenokên gelî. vol. 4 : Bûka Gulsûn, Uppsala : Deng Publishers, 85 pp., ISBN 91-970702-9-7, 1990.
5. Pêkenokên gelî. vol. 5 : Mela Kulî, Uppsala : Deng Publishers, 93 pp., ISBN 91-88246-00-0, 1991.

=== Articles ===
1. On the role of myth in Kurdish literature : presented at the International Writers' Reunion in Lahti, Finland, June 15-19, 1981. - Lahti : International Writers' Reunion.
