= Şivan Perwer =

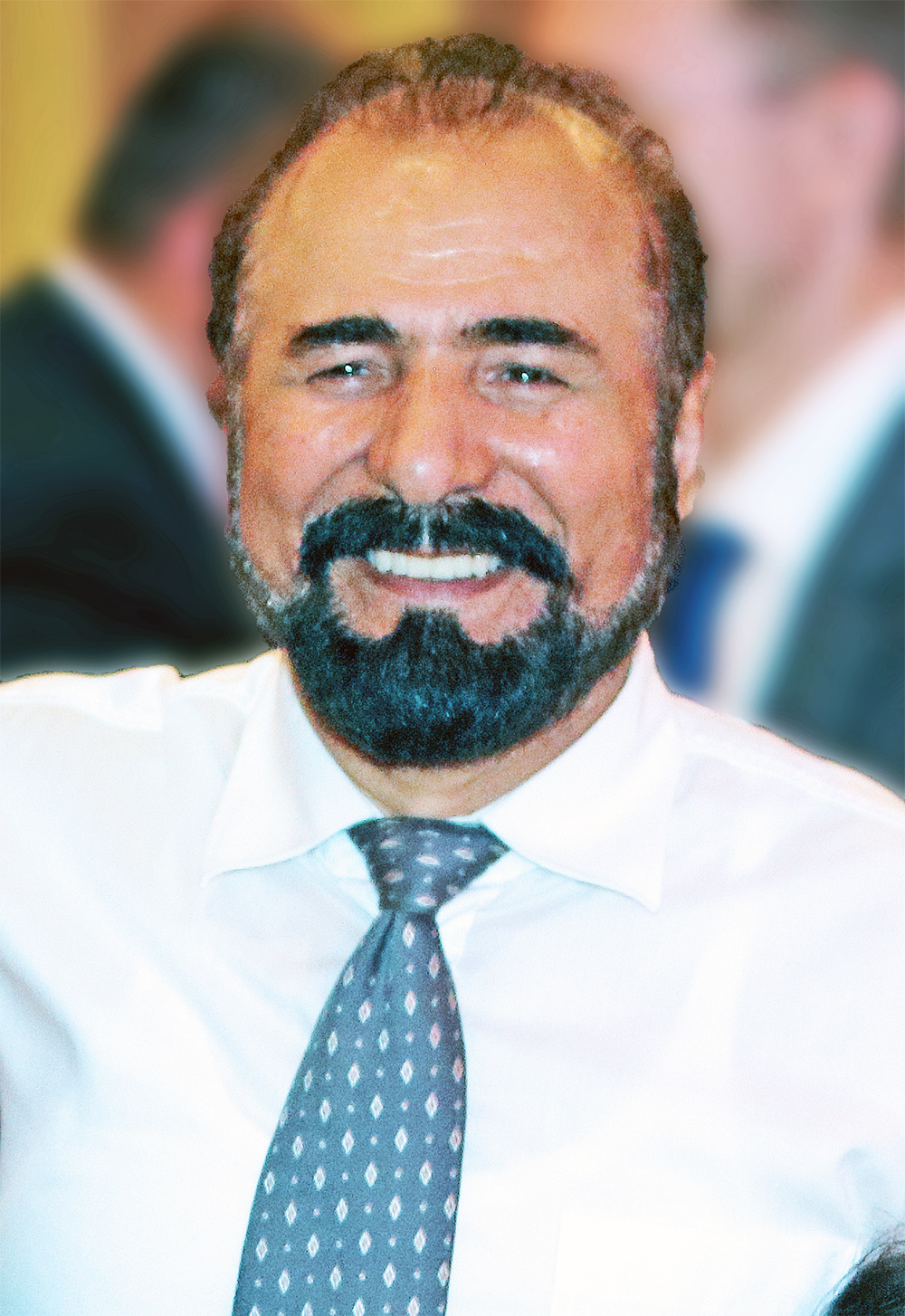
- Şivan Perwer during a ceremony in July 2016

Background information
- Born: İsmail Aygün; 23 December 1955 (age 70); Viranşehir, Şanlıurfa, Turkey
- Genre: Kurdish folk music
- Occupations: Poet, writer, singer, performer
- Instruments: Tembûr
- Years active: 1974–present
- Website: www.sivanperwer.org

Şivan Perwer (born İsmail Aygün on 23 December 1955) is a Kurdish poet, writer, music teacher, and singer. Perwer fled Turkey in 1976 due to bans and restrictions imposed on Kurdish music. He lived in continuous exile for 37 years, returning to Diyarbakır on 16 November 2013 upon an invitation by the prime minister of Turkey at the time, Recep Tayyip Erdoğan.

Perwer also holds several honorary doctorates in music.

== Birth and early life ==
Şivan (meaning shepherd in Kurdish) Perwer was officially born on 23 December 1955 as İsmail Aygün in Viranşehir, Şanlıurfa.

Perwer was exposed to Kurdish music at a very young age, which lead him to pursuing his musical career and Kurdish writing that is highly valued in Kurdish music today.

== Biography ==
For 25 years, Perwer's songs were banned in Iraq, Syria, and Turkey because they are sung in Kurdish and often cite the oppression against the Kurdish people in the Middle East, most notably Turkey. Cassettes of his music were passed along from hand to hand, despite the risk of imprisonment or death. Şivan became famous during the period of Kurdish protests against Iraqi rule at Ankara University in 1972. His homemade recordings were smuggled over the border, while thousands of people came to see him perform live. Fearing for his life and the welfare of his family and after calls from Turkish authorities demanding his arrest, he fled Turkey and settled in Germany in 1976. There, Perwer recorded his first official album of traditional Kurdish songs.

In 1991, Perwer performed at the "Simple Truth" Live aid concert, alongside Chris de Burgh, Madonna, Rod Stewart, as well as other international artists. The proceeds from the concert went to the aid of Şivan Perwer for refugees in Iraqi Kurdistan fleeing the Gulf War and was considered one of the most important humanitarian efforts for the region. In 1999, he followed Abdullah Öcalan’s invitation to spend time with him and Mahmoud Baksi in Rome. Perwer's music had a strong influence on the PKK (Kurdistan Workers Party, which Öcalan led), since his songs were often about the karker (meaning worker in Kurdish). In 2004, Şivan took an initiative for the improvement of culture in society by establishing the Sivan Perwer International Cultural Foundation in Frankfurt, Germany. On Tuesday, March 21, 2006, Şivan Perwer was featured on PRI's The World in their Global Hits segment.

In 2013, he visited Turkey for the first time after he left for Germany in 1976. He arrived upon the invitation by Masoud Barzani, who met with Recep Tayyip Erdoğan. There, he and Ibrahim Tatlises sung at a mass wedding in Diyarbakir of 300 couples led by the two politicians. His return was met with mixed feelings by the Kurds. Some were excited to hear him, others wished he would not have come back to show his support for Erdoğan right before the local elections, but rather to contribute to the ongoing Kurdish-Turkish peace process.

Thus far, Şivan Perwer has produced over thirty albums, music videos and documentaries. He has written several books and several other publications as well. Şivan has a career expanding over forty years and has received many honorary doctorates and International World music prizes. He has composed music and sung many songs using the poetry of the late Kurdish poet, Cigerxwîn. Cigerxwîn was well known for his poetry about the Kurdish struggle and also about Kurdish culture and history. At one time, Cigerxwîn referred to Şivan as "the Voice of his poetry". Kurdish songs (or dengbêj) are considered by some to be one of the key elements in preserving Kurdish culture and history. Şivan Perwer was very close to Hessin Abdulrahman Swari, who is one of the main reasons for Perwer's fame. Swari was considered by Kurds a man of great integrity and held close ties between Kurds from all parts of Kurdistan.

== Discography ==
- Govenda Azadîxwazan (1975)
- Hevalê Bargiran im (1976)
- Herne Pêş (1977)
- Ey Ferat (1978)
- Kî ne Em (1979)
- Hay Dil (1980)
- Gelê Min Rabe (1981)
- Agirî (1982)
- Bilbilo / Ferzê (1983)
- Dotmam (1985)
- Le Dîlbere (1986)
- Helebçe (1988)
- Chants Du Kurdistan (1989)
- Xewna Min / Qasimlo (1991)
- Zembîlfiroş (1992)
- Ya Star (1995)
- Naze(1996)
- Hêviya Te (1999)
- Roj û Heyv (2000)
- Sare (2002)
- Helbestên bijartî yên 1 /Kirîvê (2002)
- Helbestên bijartî yên 2/Klasîk (2003)
- Helbestên Bijarti yên 3 (2004)
- Şivanname 1 - Gazind (2012)
- Şivanname 2 - Destana Rojava (2012)
- Sivanname 3 - Şahî û Dilşadî (2015)
