= Aram Tigran =

Syrian-Armenian singer

Aram Tigran Aramê Dîkran
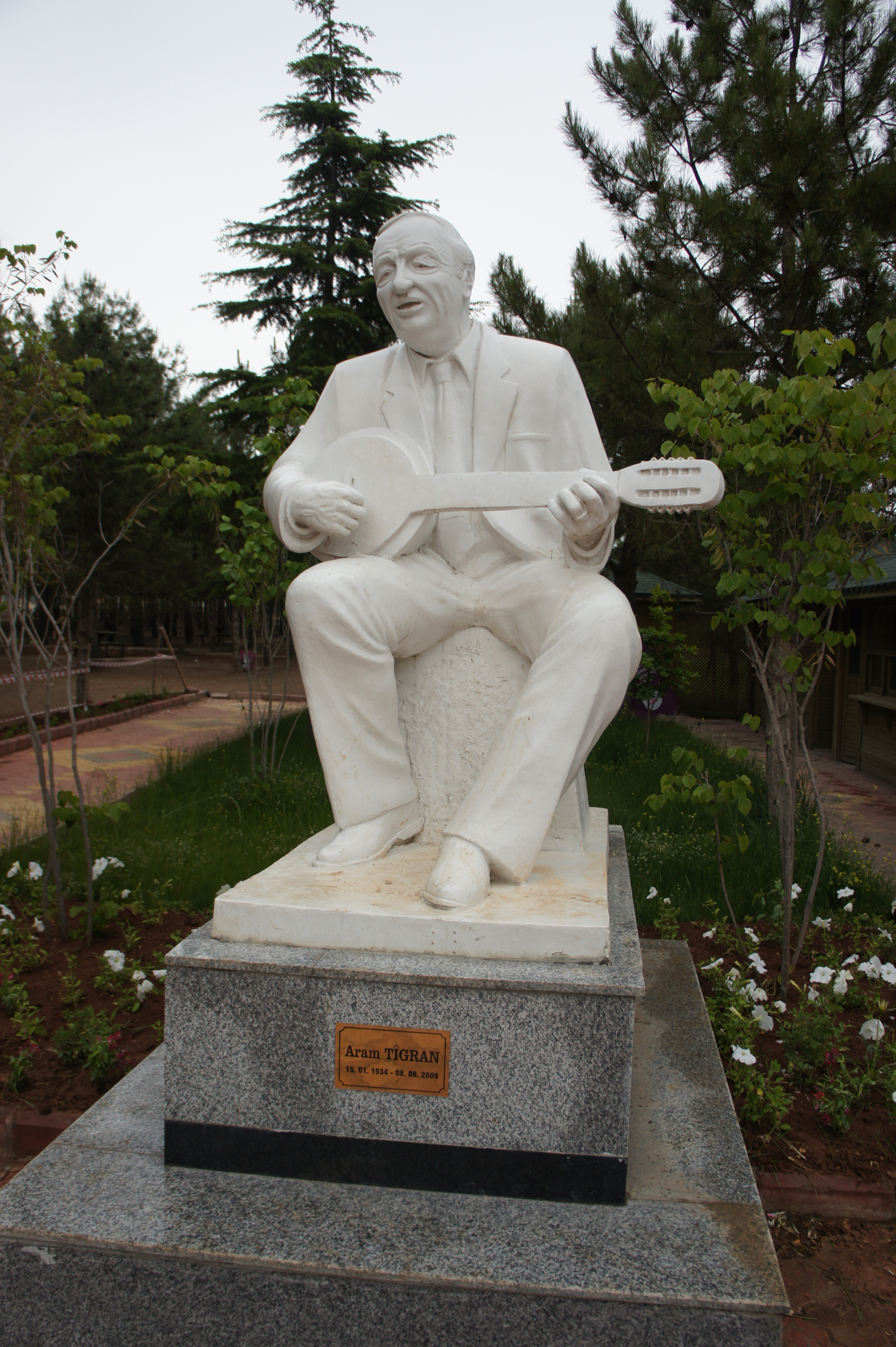
- Statue of Aram Tigran in Silvan, Diyarbakir, Turkey

Background information
- Born: Aram Melikyan; 1934; Qamishli, Syria
- Origin: Armenian, Kurdish
- Died: August 8, 2009 (aged 74–75) Athens, Greece
- Genres: Kurdish, Arabic, Syriac, Armenian
- Occupations: Singer, Musician
- Instruments: Oud, Cümbüş
- Works: "Heval Ferat"; "Em hatin"; "Aydil"; "Diyarbekira serin"; "Daye min berde"; "Ay dilberê"; "Ey Welato Em Heliyan"; "Keçê Dinê"; "Evîna Feqiyê Teyran"; "Rabin"; "Xazî Dîsa Zarbûma"; "Kurdistan"; "Serxwebûn Xweş E"; "Zîlan"; "Çîyayê Gebarê"
- Years active: 1953–2009

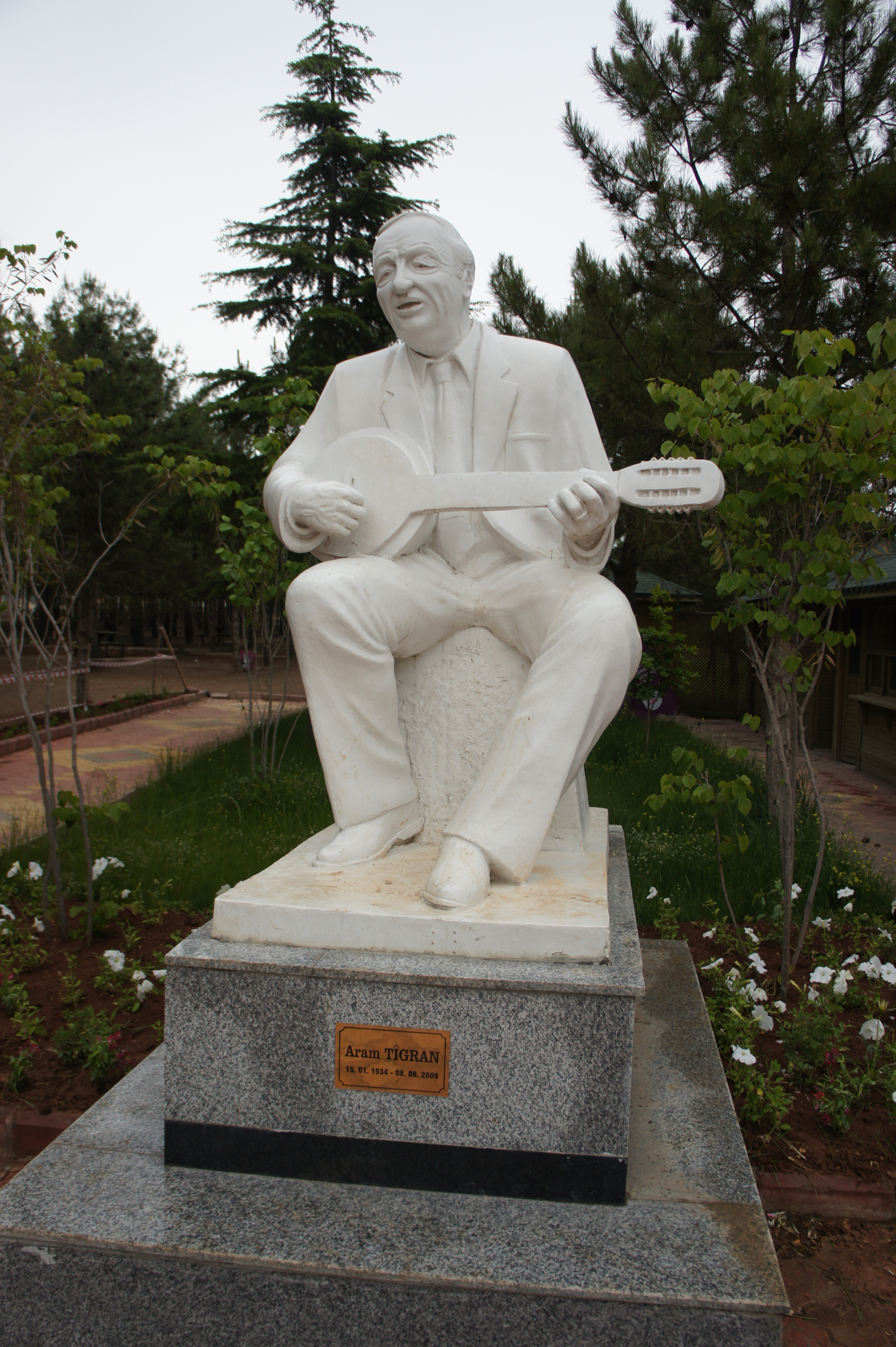
Statue of Aram Tigran in Silvan, Diyarbakir, Turkey

Aram Tigran (Armenian: Արամ Տիգրան) or Aramê Dîkran (Kurdish rendering from Armenian), born Aram Melikyan (Armenian: Արամ Մէլիքեան), (1934 – 8 August 2009) was a contemporary Syrian-Armenian singer who sang primarily in Kurdish. Among Assyrians in Qamishli, he was known as Aram Dikran.

Tigran was born in Qamishli in northeastern Syria to an Armenian family originally from Diyarbakır. Both of his parents were born in villages near the city Diyarbakır. His first Oud he received from his uncle at the age of six. After finishing ninth grade, he concentrated his efforts on learning music and playing Oud and in 1953 he gave his first public concert at the Newroz celebrations. By the age of twenty years, he was singing in four languages: Kurdish, Arabic, Assyrian and Armenian. In 1966 he moved to Yerevan, Armenia, at the time a part of the Soviet Union, where he was employed for eighteen years at Radio Yerevan. He left Armenia in 1995 and settled in Athens. He is considered among the best of contemporary Kurdish singers and musicians. He recorded 230 songs in Kurdish, 150 in Arabic, 10 in Syriac, 8 in Greek. In 2009 he was able to visit the villages, where his parents grew up in the Ottoman Empire (present day Turkey), where he was welcomed in Diyarbakır and gave a concert at the Newroz celebrations in Batman.

Tigran died in Athens on August 8, 2009, in the Evangelismos General Hospital. Tigran wanted to be buried in Diyarbakır in Turkey, an aim supported by the pro-Kurdish Democratic Society Party (DTP), but the Turkish Ministry of the Interior refused this request, on grounds that he was not a Turkish citizen. Instead he was buried in Brussels, Cimetery of Jette and some soil from Diyarbakır was poured into his grave.

He was married and had three children.

== Albums ==
- Çîyayê Gebarê, Aydın Müzik, 2004.
- Zîlan, Aydın Müzik, 2004.
- Serxwebûn Xweş E, Aydın Müzik, 2004.
- Kurdistan, Aydın Müzik, 2004
- Xazî Dîsa Zarbûma
- Rabin
- Evîna Feqiyê Teyran
- Keçê Dinê
- Ey Welato Em Heliyan
- Ay dilberê
- Daye min berde
- Diyarbekira serin
- Aydil
- Em hatin
- Heval Ferat
