= Jineology =

Form of feminism advocated by PKK leader Abdullah Öcalan

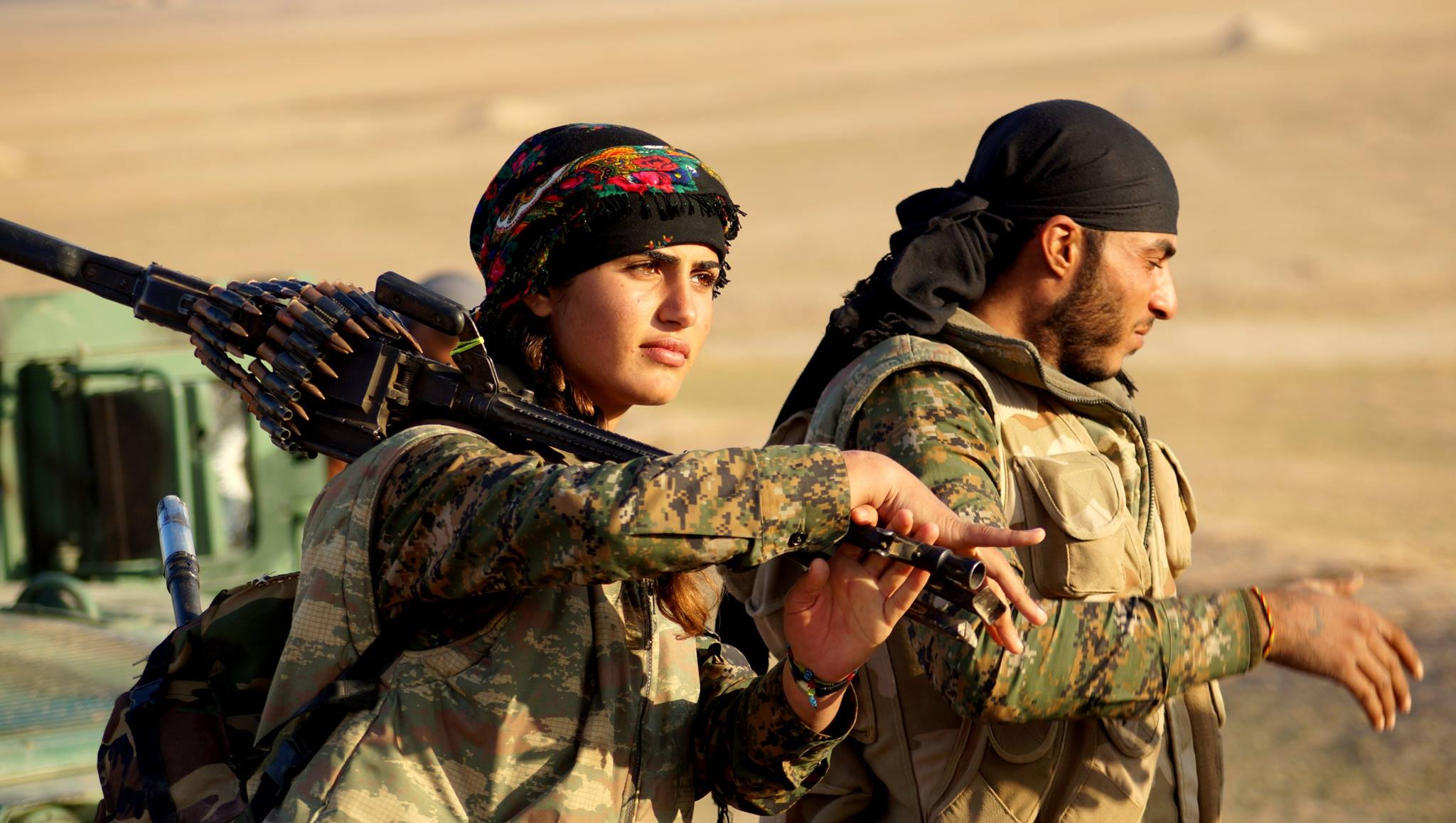
Asia Ramazan Antar (1998–2016) was a Women's Protection Units (YPJ) fighter

Jineology (Kurdish: Jineolojî) is an ideology advocated for and practiced by the Kurdistan Workers' Party (PKK). Originally, developed by the Kurdish Women's Freedom Movement, its theoretical formulations may also be found in the writings of Abdullah Öcalan, the representative leader of the PKK. Jineology may be considered to be a women's paradigm. Jineologists advocate for the abolition of patriarchal systems and of women's oppression.

Jineology is a component of democratic confederalism, a philosophy that underpinned the governance of the Autonomous Administration of North and East Syria (also known as Rojava).

Jineology has been described as a feminist movement, but this description is not uniformly accepted by its practitioners.

== History ==
The Kurdistan Communities Union (KCK) is an umbrella organization that includes the Democratic Union Party (PYD) and PKK. In 2005, the KCK abandoned its goal of establishing a separate Kurdish state and instead advocated for democratic confederalism. In 2012, the PYD gained control over a large portion of northern Syria and declared autonomy, implementing self-governance under the model of democratic confederalism. This region, known as Rojava or the Autonomous Administration of North and East Syria, made up around one fifth of Syrian territory before the Turkish invasion of the region in 2016. The PYD's paramilitary force consists of the People's Protection Units (YPG) and the Women's Protection Units (YPJ).

The Kurdish women's liberation movement draws heavily upon the theory of Abdullah Öcalan, founder of the PKK. Öcalan coined the term 'Jineoloji' and invented democratic confederalism, the system of government implemented in Rojava.

== Definition and ideology ==
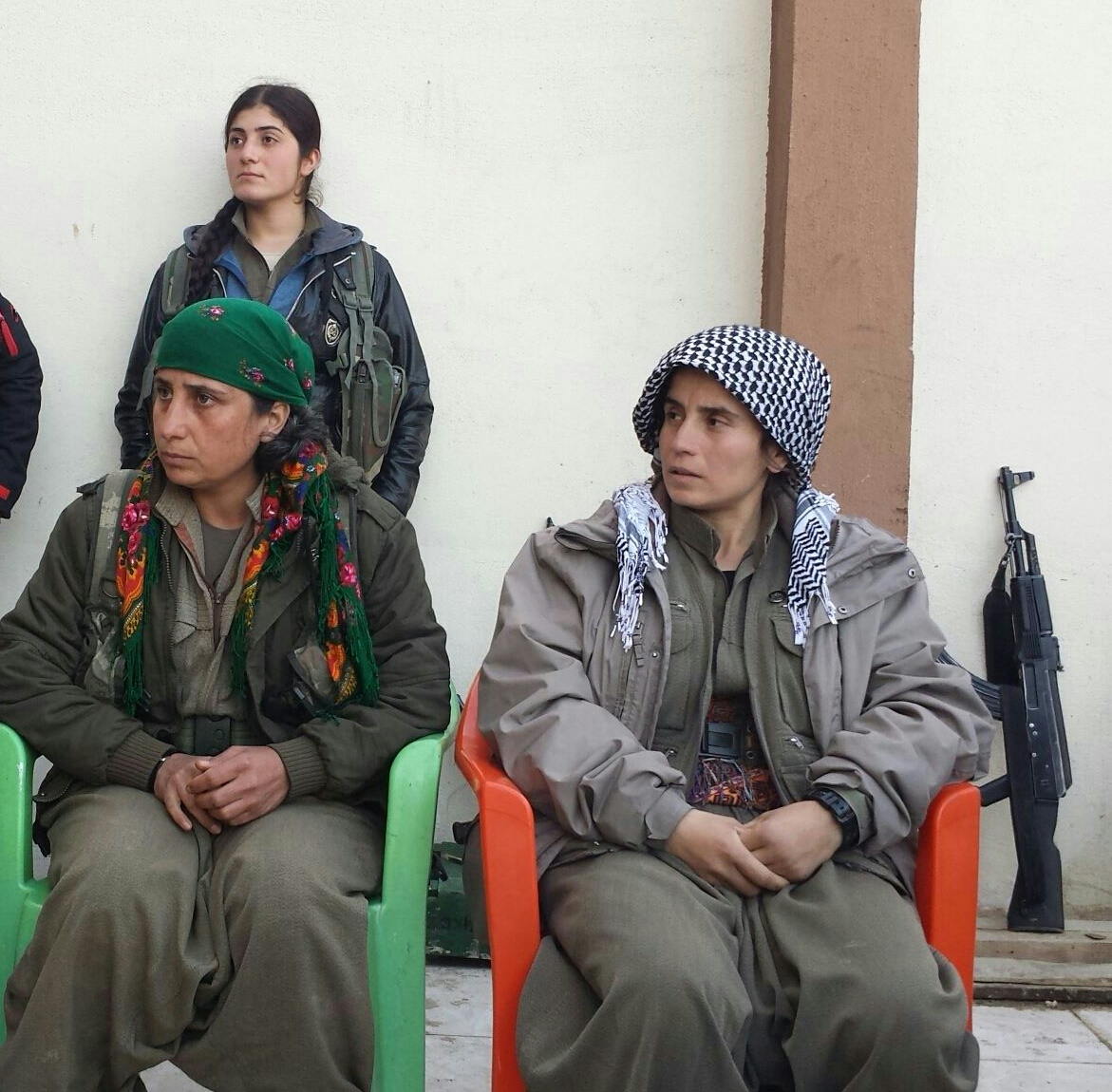
Kurdish YPG and PKK Fighters

In Kurdish, the word jin (ژن) means "woman". Jineology is sometimes translated into English as the science of women or women's science. In the PKK's statement "Women's Liberation Ideology", the use of "a fundamental scientific term" is meant to "fill the gaps that the current social sciences are incapable of doing".

In Liberating life: Women's Revolution (2013), Abdullah Öcalan writes:

The extent to which society can be thoroughly transformed is determined by the extent of the transformation attained by women. Similarly, the level of woman's freedom and equality determines the freedom and equality of all sections of society. . . . For a democratic nation, woman's freedom is of great importance too, as liberated woman constitutes liberated society. Liberated society in turn constitutes democratic nation. Moreover, the need to reverse the role of man is of revolutionary importance.

Öcalan has said "a country can't be free unless the women are free", and echoed Charles Fourier, saying that the level of woman's freedom determines the level of freedom in society at large. Additionally, the PKK's "Women's Liberation Ideology" statement asserts that "Jineology is built on the principle that without the freedom of women within society and without a real consciousness surrounding women no society can call itself free".

Jineology, a set of principles that includes the rejection of the nation-state system, governance through democratic confederalism, and the promotion of self-sustainability through ecological awareness and collective armament, has been embraced by Kurdish women. While these principles are seen as a means of challenging patriarchy, they are also viewed in contrast to Western feminism, which is associated with capitalism and statism. Jineological principles embraced by Kurdish women are concerned with challenging patriarchy and the intersection of patriarchy with other forms of hegemony.

Jineology is a discipline that seeks to recover and study knowledge about women in order to challenge the belief that women are inferior or "defective" versions of men and to address the exclusion of women from intellectual history. It aims to rehabilitate and value traditionally belittled aspects of female existence, such as "women's work". Jineology recognizes that the nation-state is closely linked to patriarchy and reproduces it because it is inherently hegemonic and masculinist. To describe this interconnectedness, Jineologists use the term "statism-sexism-powerism" to emphasize the inseparability of these forms of hegemony.

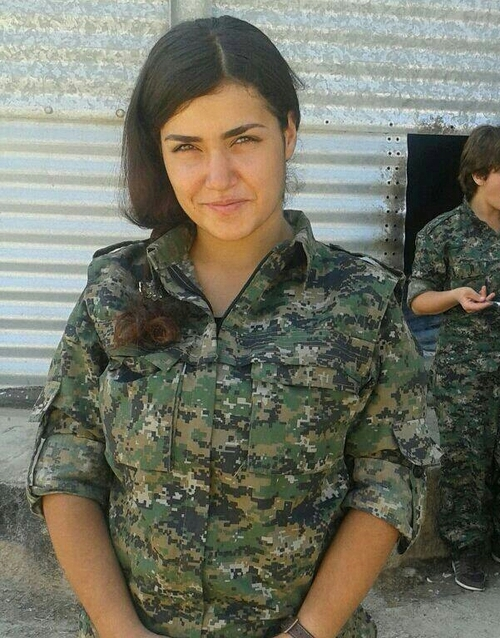
Member of the Women's Protection Units (YPJ) with a standard uniform

== Jineology in practice ==
Jineology is a fundamental tenet of the KCK's democratic confederalism and as such central to the Kurds' social revolution taking place in Rojava, their de facto autonomous region in northern Syria, led by the KCK-affiliated Democratic Union Party (PYD). Consequently, women make up 40% of the Kurdish militia fighting in the Rojava conflict against the Bashar al-Assad regime and Islamic State of Iraq and the Levant (ISIL) in the Syrian Civil War. Women fight alongside men in the People's Protection Units (YPG) as well as in their own Women's Protection Units (YPJ). In the YPJ, women study the political theories of Öcalan, on whose ideology the foundations of the group were laid. For female participants in the reconstruction of northern Syria, Jineology is seen as superior to Western feminism because it aims to reject all forms of hegemony, including patriarchy and positivism, in order to establish a more sustainable peace. This is because Jineology is seen as more holistic and inclusive of all members of society. During the Rojava revolution, both men and women were required to study Jineology and ecology, and Jineology is integrated into the region's governance model rather than being treated as a separate issue focused on women's rights.

The Jineology-based agenda of "trying to break the honor-based religious and tribal rules that confine women" is controversial and overcoming controversy in conservative quarters of society in northern Syria. The development of Jineology is one of five pillars in the Kurdish women's movement in Rojava with the Kongreya Star umbrella organization, focused "on protecting each other, resisting ISIL and building an egalitarian community in the middle of a warzone". In the instance of ISIL, the YPG/YPJ resisted the organization's sexism, who in the mid-2010s became more permissive of its members committing sexual violence against their captors, a break from original jihadist attitudes towards women. In the context of the Turkish invasion of the area, the YPG/YPJ has engaged in sporadic combat against these state attacks. Self-defense extends into the intellectual domain with Rojava participants claiming the right to protect themselves from epistemic attacks by making decisions and generating awareness about themselves. It is for this reason that Women's and Youth Committees were established, with veto power over decisions affecting them; it is also for this reason that women's and Asayish academies exist, as well as Jineology. Jineology is one of many courses offered at Kongreya Star's women's academy.

== Criticism ==
Somayeh Rostampour argues that Jineology is a difficult ideology for academics to analyze because of discrepancies between academic circles and Jineologist spaces. Many texts related to Jineology are not signed and Öcalan is not required to cite sources for his claims. Because it is a combination of Western and Eastern philosophies, it is difficult to categorize Jineology under a singular theoretical framework.

Furthermore, Rostampour claims Jineology is one-dimensional, merely focusing on what the PKK deems important, namely "democracy and mobilization", because of its proponents' isolation from both local and international academic and activist circles. In Turkey, state pressure has limited the PKK's budget for addressing sexism and many revolutionaries, including women, are imprisoned for their activism. Many of these activists also come from low-income and rural backgrounds where they do not have access to a global education or dialogues with international women's rights advocates. The lack of "multidimensional data and analyses" means that the current iteration of Jineology cannot address issues beyond the PKK's scope of attention, such as queer studies.

The centrality of Öcalan in Jineology limits Jineologists' ability to form a philosophy separate from him. Despite Öcalan's promotion of women being central to PKK ideology and the upsurge of female membership in the 1990s, Jineology in the 1990s arguably did not revolutionize Kurdish gender hierarchy, it merely changed discourse surrounding women's role in the PKK as a recruitment tactic. In his declaration "Woman and Family Question", Öcalan maintained the patriarchal rhetoric of Kurdish men as 'protectors', but proposed they shift their focus from protecting "women's honor" to protecting "the honor of the homeland".

Because of these superficial shifts, Kurdish women in the 1990s only occupied low-level positions within the party and lacked any decision-making power. Women's sexuality was also heavily policed within the party in lieu of conservative families' policing. Because women were considered weak and therefore a liability to the PKK's cause, they were expected to perform extreme acts of loyalty, accounting for the high number of female suicide bombers.

== See also ==
- Uprisings led by women
- Rojava–Islamist conflict
- Woman, Life, Freedom

== Bibliography ==
- Killing the Male. 1997/98. Mahir Sayın, Abdullah Öcalan (interviewee).
