= Darya =

Darya means lake or sea in Persian and river in Tajik. It may refer to

People

- Daria (given name)
- Farhad Darya (born 1962), Afghan singer, composer, music producer, and philanthropist

Rivers

- Amu Darya, a river in Central Asia
- Fan Darya, a river in Tajikistan
- Iskander Darya, a river in Tajikistan
- Kara Darya, a river in Central Asia
- Syr Darya, a river in Central Asia

Localities

- Darya Bon, a village in Iran
- Darya Khan, a town in the Punjab Province of Pakistan
- Darya Poshteh, a village in Iran
- Darya Pur Kalan, a village in Delhi, India
- Darya Sar (disambiguation), multiple localities
- Khoshkeh Darya, a village in Iran
- Padali Darya, a village in India
- Ru Darya, a village in Iran
- Wadgaon Darya, a village in India
