= Ardeshir Kamkar =

Ardeshir (or in higher Persian: Ardashir) Kamkar
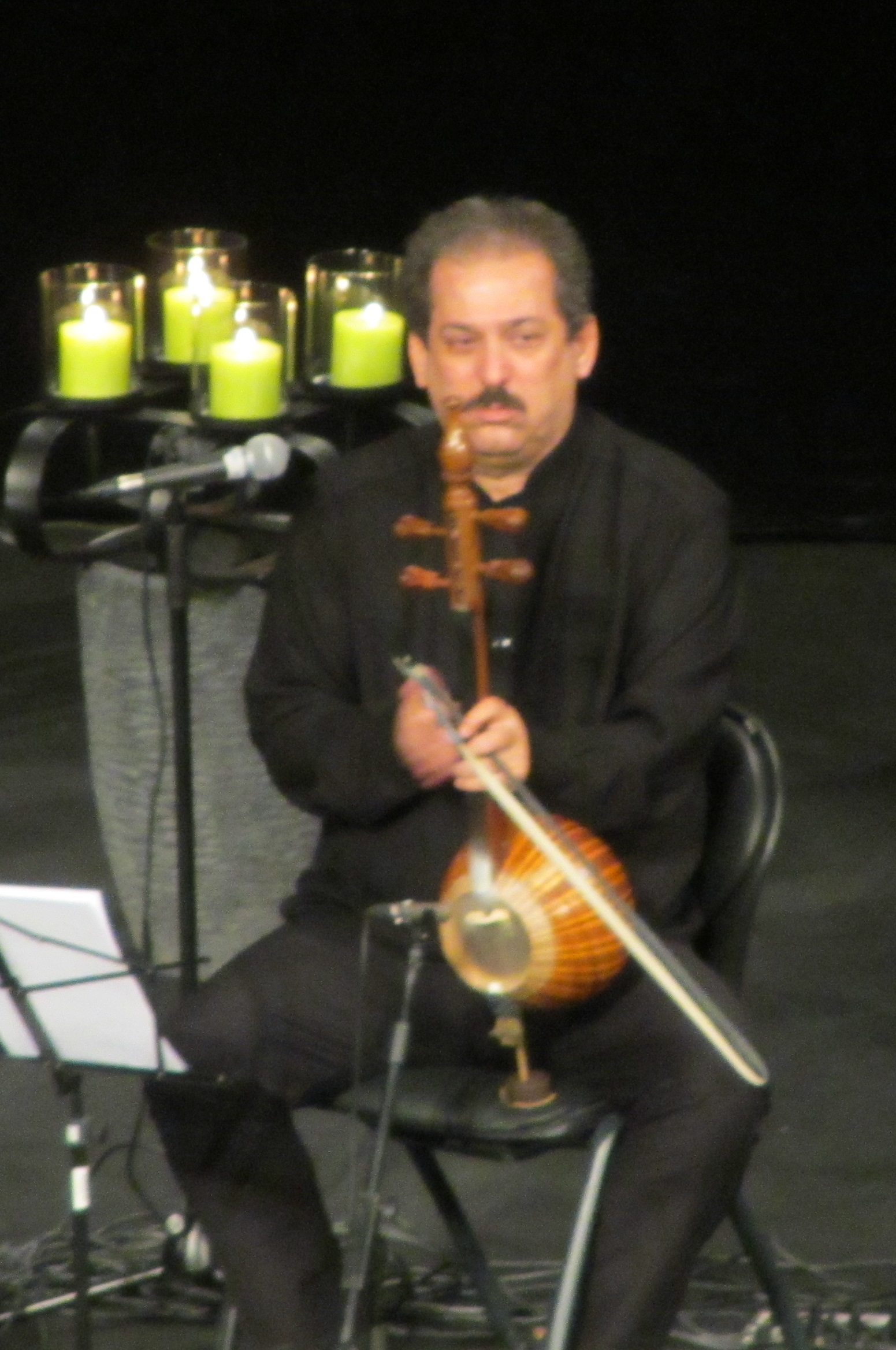

Background information
- Born: 1962 (age 62–63); Sanandaj, Kurdistan Province, Iran
- Genres: Traditional Kurdish and Persian
- Instruments: Kamancheh; Ghaychak
- Years active: ?–present
- Labels: Various
- Website: www.kamkars.net/Ardeshir

Ardeshir Kamkar (Persian: اردشیر کامکار, born 1962 in Sanandaj, Iran) is a Kurdish musician from Iran.

He started his music training under the supervision of his father. He came to Tehran in 1980 and continued studying traditional arrangements under Mohammad Reza Lotfi and his brother Pashang. Ardeshir has always been keen to explore the range and capabilities of the kamancheh, for which he has written several pieces and books.

Kamkar has played with famous ensembles such as Dastan, Aref and Sheyda. In the album of Dastan (1364 Iranian calendar), he accompanied the improvisation of M. R. Shajarian. He has recently worked with the talented vocalist Homayoun Shajarian.

He also has international collaboration. One well-received album of which is titled "From Pontos to Persia" (Greek Άπο τον Πόντο στην Περσία), which according to some sources "is a unique CD that combines the music of Pontos and that of Persia. Matthaios Tsahouridis plays the Pontic Lyra accompanied by Ardeshir Kamkar on the Iranian Kamancheh and Hussein Zahawy on the daf. Songs include Pontic Lyra Improvisation, Union, Horizons, The Meeting, Solo Daf and Iranian Kamancheh Improvisation."

== See also ==
- Kamkar
- The Kamkars
- Kurdish music
- Music of Iran
- Demonstration with Mathaios Tsahouridis
