= Kurdistan Philharmonic Orchestra =

- Founded: 2005
- Location: Sanandaj, Kurdistan
- Principal conductor: Mehdi Ahmadi

The Kurdish Philharmonic Orchestra is one of the few active classical music orchestras in Iran. It was founded in 2005 by a group of musicians in the city of Sanandaj.

== Introduction ==
The idea of establishing a Kurdish Philharmonic Orchestra was brought to life in 2005 by a group of musicians in Sanandaj. Kurdistan Philharmonic Orchestra is one of the most active collectives of the Kurdistan province, which has held several programs in Sanandaj during the past few years and organized the Fajr Music Festival. In addition to performing several live programs in recent months, the group has held specialized workshops and workshops with a number of Iranian and foreign artists.

== Members ==
Currently, the orchestra is directed by Mehdi Ahmadi, one of orchestra founders. The concertmaster Arsalan Kamkar and more than 50 musicians from classical music are members of the orchestra.

== Board of directors ==
- Bahman Moradnia, governor of Kurdistan province (legal member)
- Hamid Reza Ardalan
- Nader Mashayekhi
- Hooshang Kamkar
- Mohammad-Reza Darvishi
- Mehdi Ahmadi (conductor)
- Amin Moradi (legal member)

=== Ex-members ===
- Loris Tjeknavorian
- Mohammad Reza Tafazzoli
