= Ata Nahai =

Iranian novelist and short story writer (born 1960)

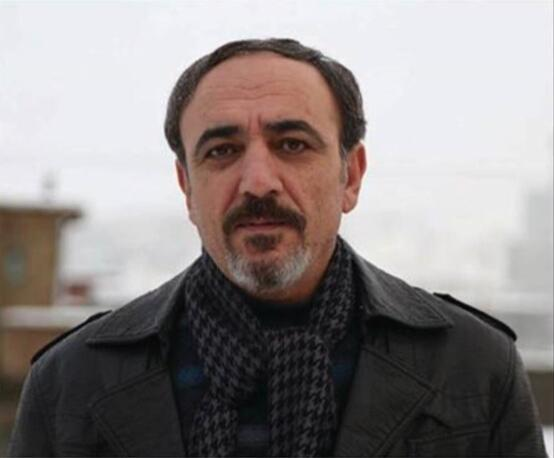
- Born: 1960 (age 65–66); Baneh, Kurdistan province, Imperial State of Iran
- Citizenship: Iranian
- Occupations: novelist, short story writer, translator, critic
- Writing career
- Language: Sorani Kurdish
- Notable awards: Aras prize Ahmad Hardi prize of Gelawej Festival

Ata Nahai (Kurdish: عەتا نەھایی; Persian: عطا نهایی) is a Kurdish-Iranian novelist and short story writer who writes in Sorani Kurdish.

He was born in Baneh in 1960. He was graduated from high school in 1978, receiving a diploma of literature. As to the revolutionary atmosphere of Iran in 1979 and the universities being closed for the next four years he could not continue his studies. He began his literary career by writing short stories in Kurdish (Sorani) and producing essays on the art of fiction. He has published three collections of short stories and three novels in Kurdish as well as translating a number of world short stories and literary essays into Kurdish. In the First Conference on Teaching Kurdish language, held in Tehran in 2002, he won the first vote of the elections and afterwards became the head of the Kurdish Language Academy in Iran. In 2005, Ata Nahai was awarded the Aras prize for Kurdish literature. He was also awarded the Ahmad Hardi Prize for Creativity in Sulaymaniyah in 2008.

== Works ==
- Zrike (The Scream), a collection of short stories in Kurdish, Baneh, Naji Publishers, 1993.
- Tengane (Dilemma), a collection of short stories in Kurdish, Baneh, the writer's, 1995.
- Gulli Shoran (Shoran Flower), a novel in Kurdish, Saghez, Mohamadi publishers, 1998.
- Ballendekani dem Ba (Birds Blowing with the Wind), a novel in Kurdish, Sanandaj, Jiyar publishers, 2002.
- Grewi Bakhti Hallale (Bet on Halala's Fate), a novel in Kurdish, Sulaymaniah, Ranj Publishers, 2007.

== Translations ==
Nahai has translated Houshang Golshiri's Shazde Ehtejad into Kurdish. He has also translated Milan Kundera's 'the Kafkaesque World' into Kurdish as well as a number of other short stories by famous world writers.

== See also ==
- List of Kurdish scholars
