= Baneh =

City in Kurdistan province, Iran

Baneh Persian: بانه
- City
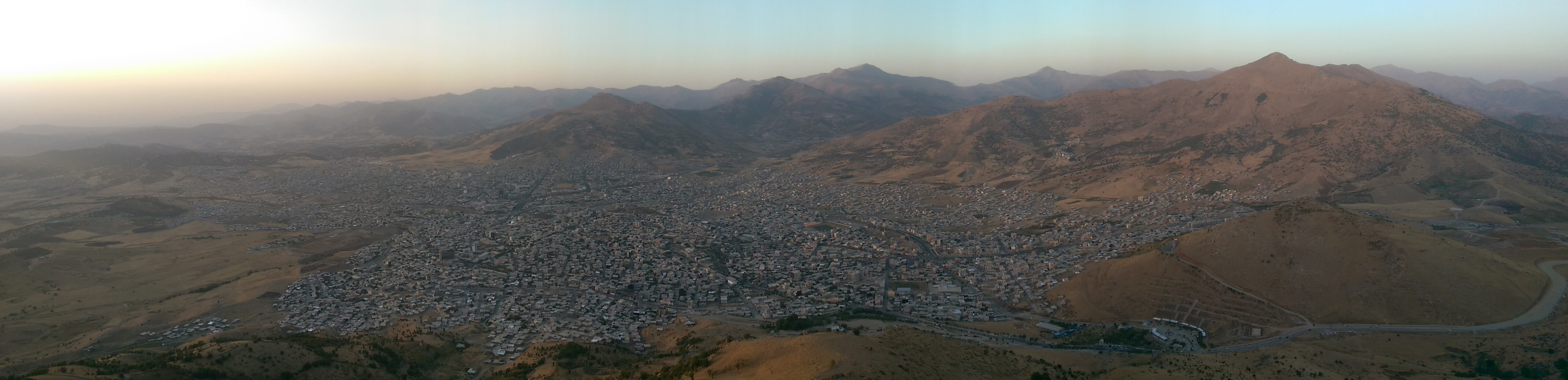
- Panorama view of Baneh

- Location within Iran Location within Iran Kurdistan
- Coordinates: 35°59′49″N 45°53′07″E
- Country: Iran
- Province: Kurdistan
- County: Baneh
- District: Central

Area
  - Total: 1,584.5 km^{2} (611.8 sq mi)
- Elevation: 1,554 m (5,098 ft)

Population (2016)
  - Total: 110,218
  - Density: 69.560/km^{2} (180.16/sq mi)
- Time zone: UTC+3:30 (IRST)
- Area code: 087-342
- Website: www.banehcity.ir

Baneh (Persian: بانه) (Note: Also romanized as Bāneh; Kurdish: بانە; also known as Bane) is a city in the Central District of Baneh County, Kurdistan province, Iran, serving as capital of both the county and the district. Baneh is approximately 30 km (18 miles) from Kurdistan Region in Iraq.

== History ==
Historically, Baneh had a strategic and political importance due to its close proximity to the Ottoman Empire. The city was part of the three Kurdish principalities; Ardalan, Baban and Mokryan.

The old city had two citadels and was generally ruled by the Eḵtīār-al-Dīn family who held both religious and secular power of the city. The family was held in high esteem during the Safavid era and received the title 'sultan'. Moreover, rulers of Baneh had the responsibility of protecting the whole area from Khoy to Kermanshah.

In the 16th century, Mīrzā Beg b. Mīr Moḥammad became the first virtually independent ruler of Baneh and its surroundings.

During the 18th and 19th centuries, the city was plagued with epidemics which killed a large portion of the population.

In 1944, the city experienced turmoil as part of the Hama Rashid revolt and was also bombed by both parties during the Iran–Iraq War in the 1980s. Most locals fled to Iraq during the war and much of the region was destroyed.

== Climate ==
Climate data for Baneh (normals 1999-2005)
Month	Jan	Feb	Mar	Apr	May	Jun	Jul	Aug	Sep	Oct	Nov	Dec	Year
Mean daily maximum °C (°F)	4.1 (39.4)	5.0 (41.0)	11.4 (52.5)	16.5 (61.7)	22.0 (71.6)	28.8 (83.8)	33.3 (91.9)	33.5 (92.3)	28.6 (83.5)	21.9 (71.4)	11.8 (53.2)	6.8 (44.2)	18.6 (65.5)
Daily mean °C (°F)	0.9 (33.6)	1.4 (34.5)	7.0 (44.6)	11.9 (53.4)	16.5 (61.7)	22.5 (72.5)	26.8 (80.2)	26.8 (80.2)	22.3 (72.1)	16.6 (61.9)	7.8 (46.0)	3.4 (38.1)	13.7 (56.6)
Mean daily minimum °C (°F)	−2.3 (27.9)	−2.1 (28.2)	2.7 (36.9)	7.4 (45.3)	10.9 (51.6)	16.2 (61.2)	20.4 (68.7)	20.2 (68.4)	15.9 (60.6)	11.3 (52.3)	3.9 (39.0)	0.0 (32.0)	8.7 (47.7)
Average precipitation mm (inches)	127.5 (5.02)	109.2 (4.30)	96.0 (3.78)	91.4 (3.60)	34.8 (1.37)	3.3 (0.13)	2.4 (0.09)	0.4 (0.02)	1.1 (0.04)	16.0 (0.63)	85.4 (3.36)	121.8 (4.80)	689.3 (27.14)
Source: IRIMO(temperatures), (precipitation)

== Demographics ==
=== Language and ethnicity ===
The population is mostly Shafiʽi Kurdish who speak Sorani.

=== Population ===
At the time of the 2006 National Census, the city's population was 69,635 in 15,857 households. The following census in 2011 counted 85,190 people in 22,149 households. The 2016 census measured the population of the city as 110,218 people in 30,743 households. After the cities of Sanandaj, Saqqez and Marivan, Baneh is the fourth most populous city in Kurdistan province.

== Notable people ==
- Ebrahim Younesi, writer and translator
- Bahman Ghobadi, director and writer
- Ata Nahaei, novelist and translator
- Ebrahim Alipour, photographer
- Keywan Karimi, director

== Gallery ==
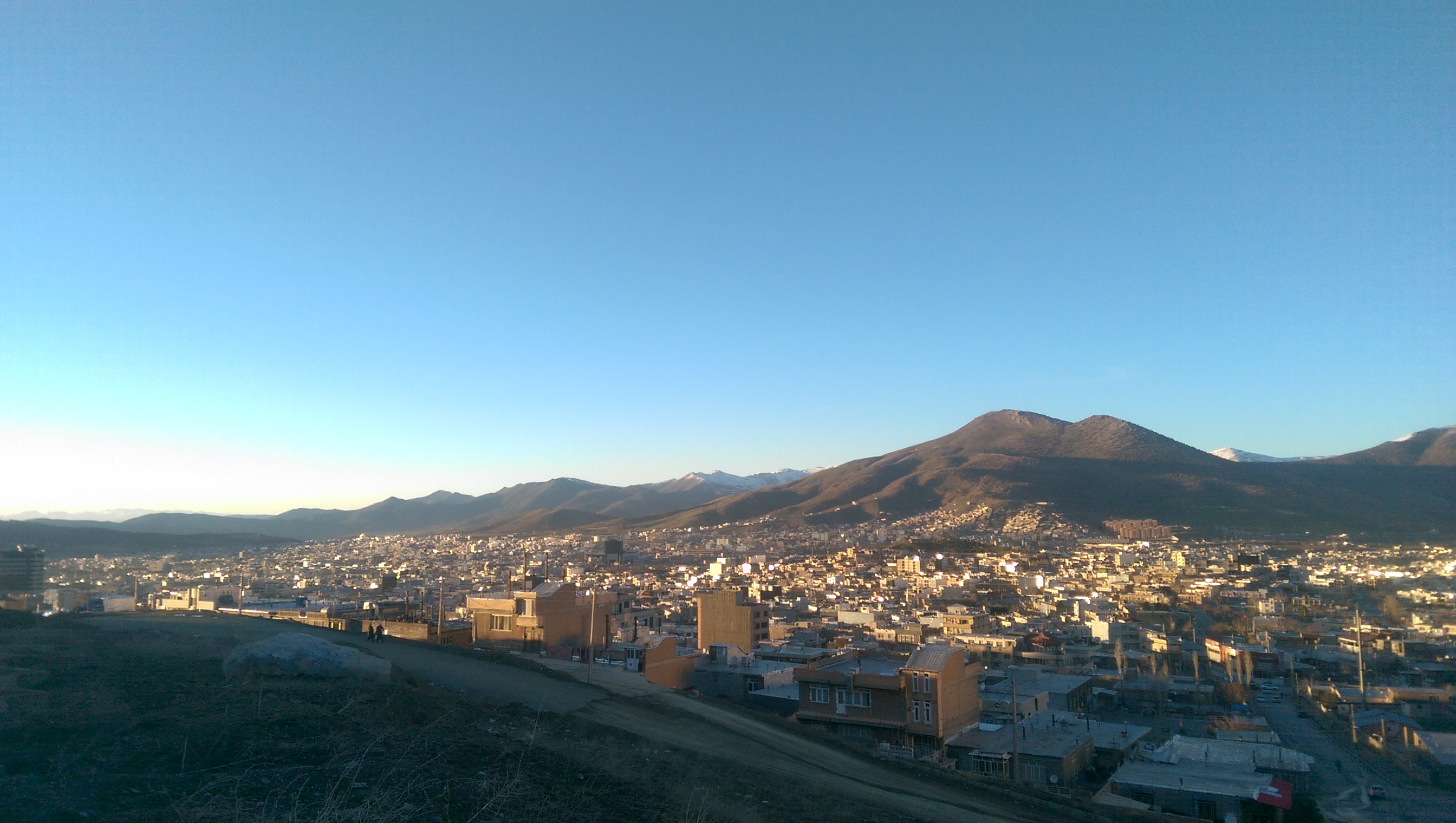
View of the city from Dokanan Park

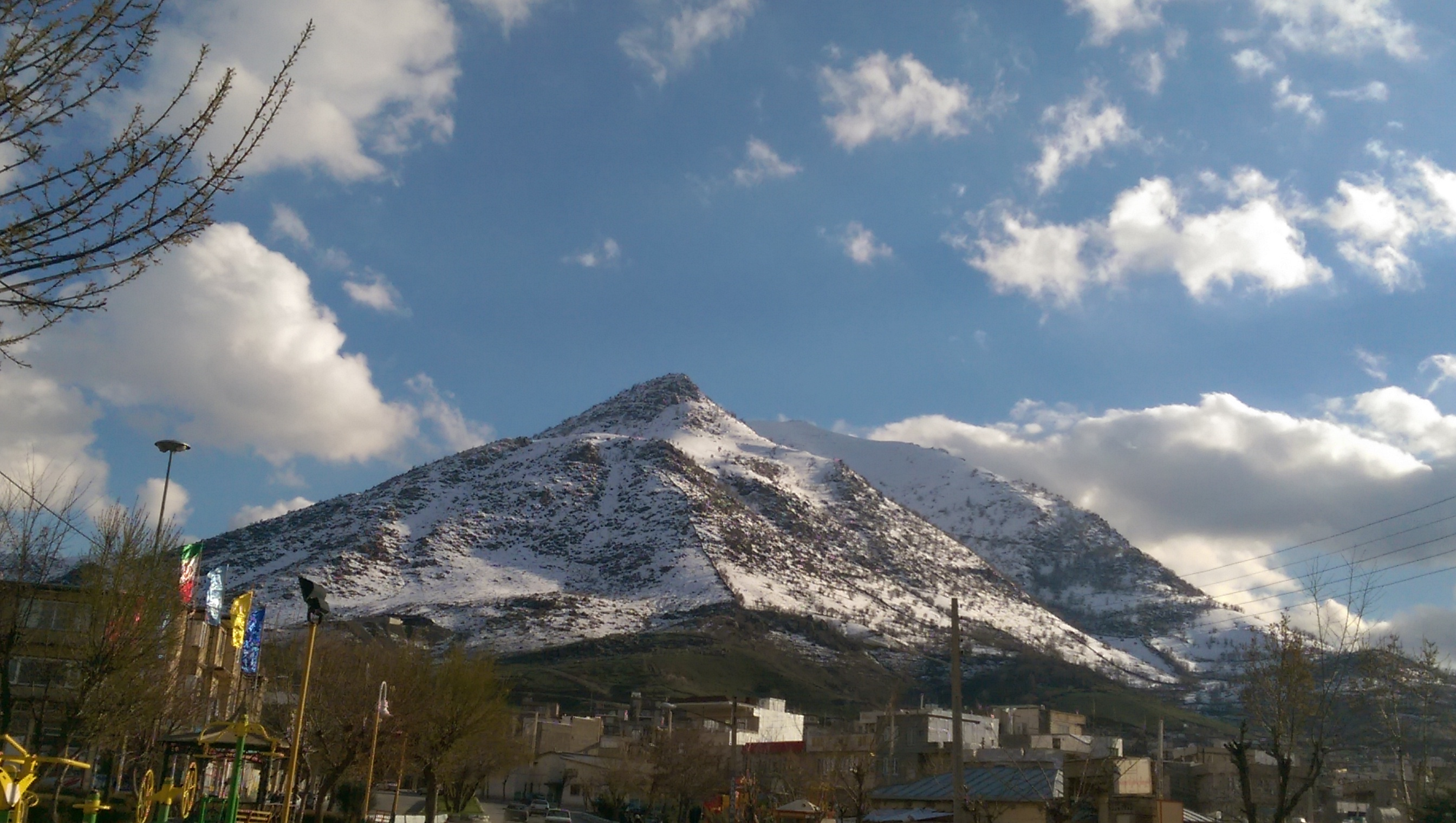
View of Arbaba on a winter's day

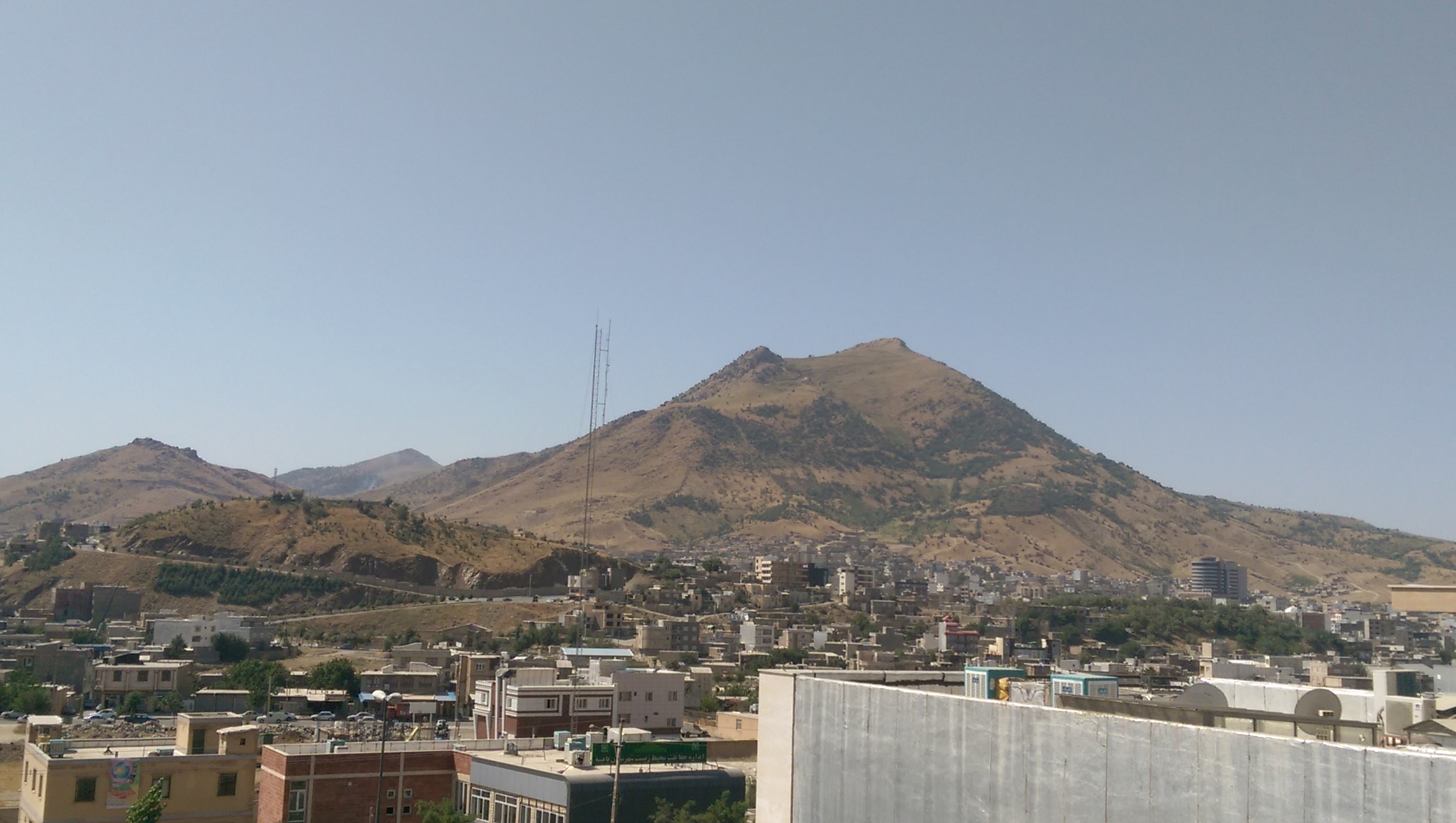
Baneh by day

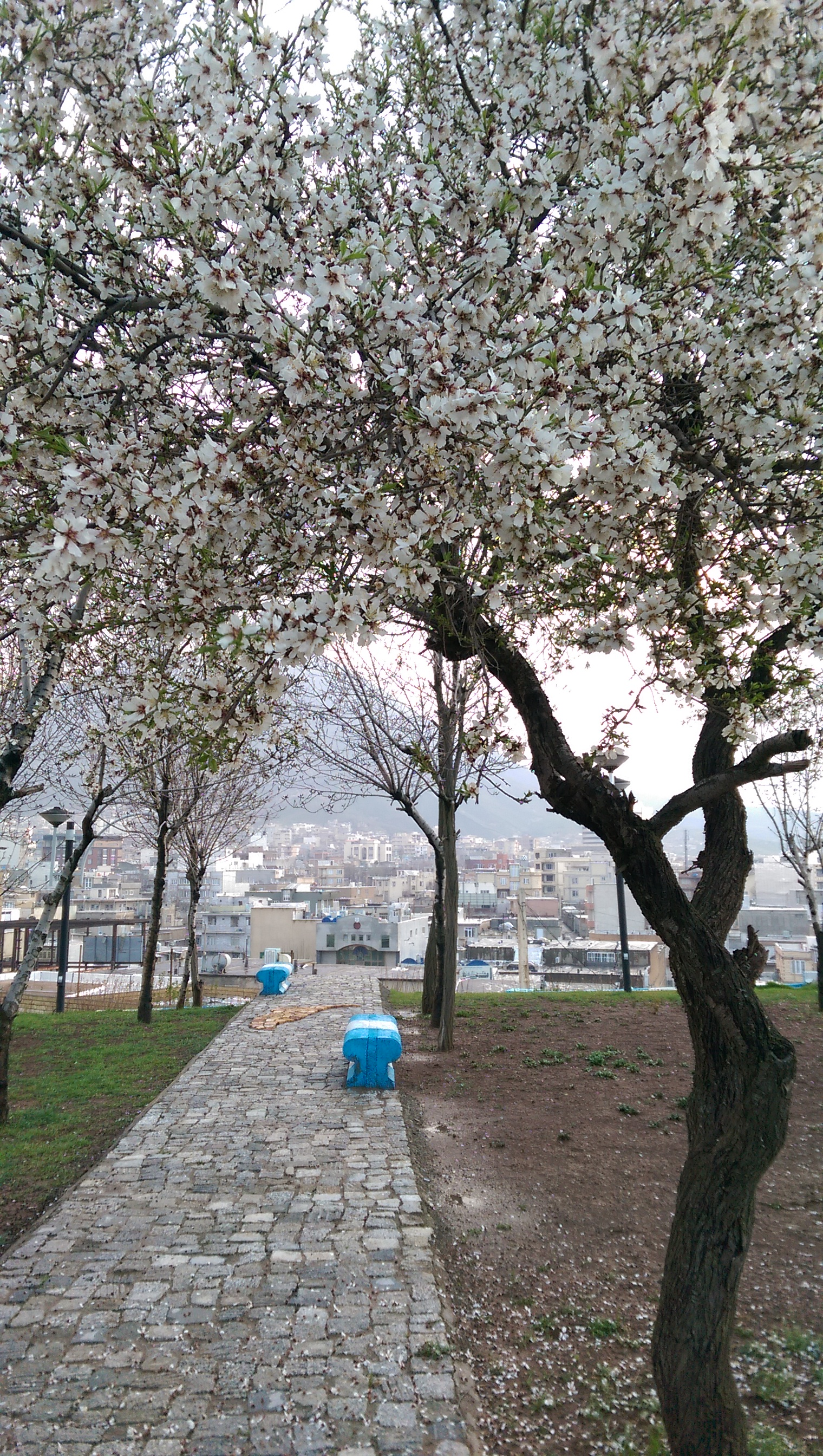
Shahr Park in spring

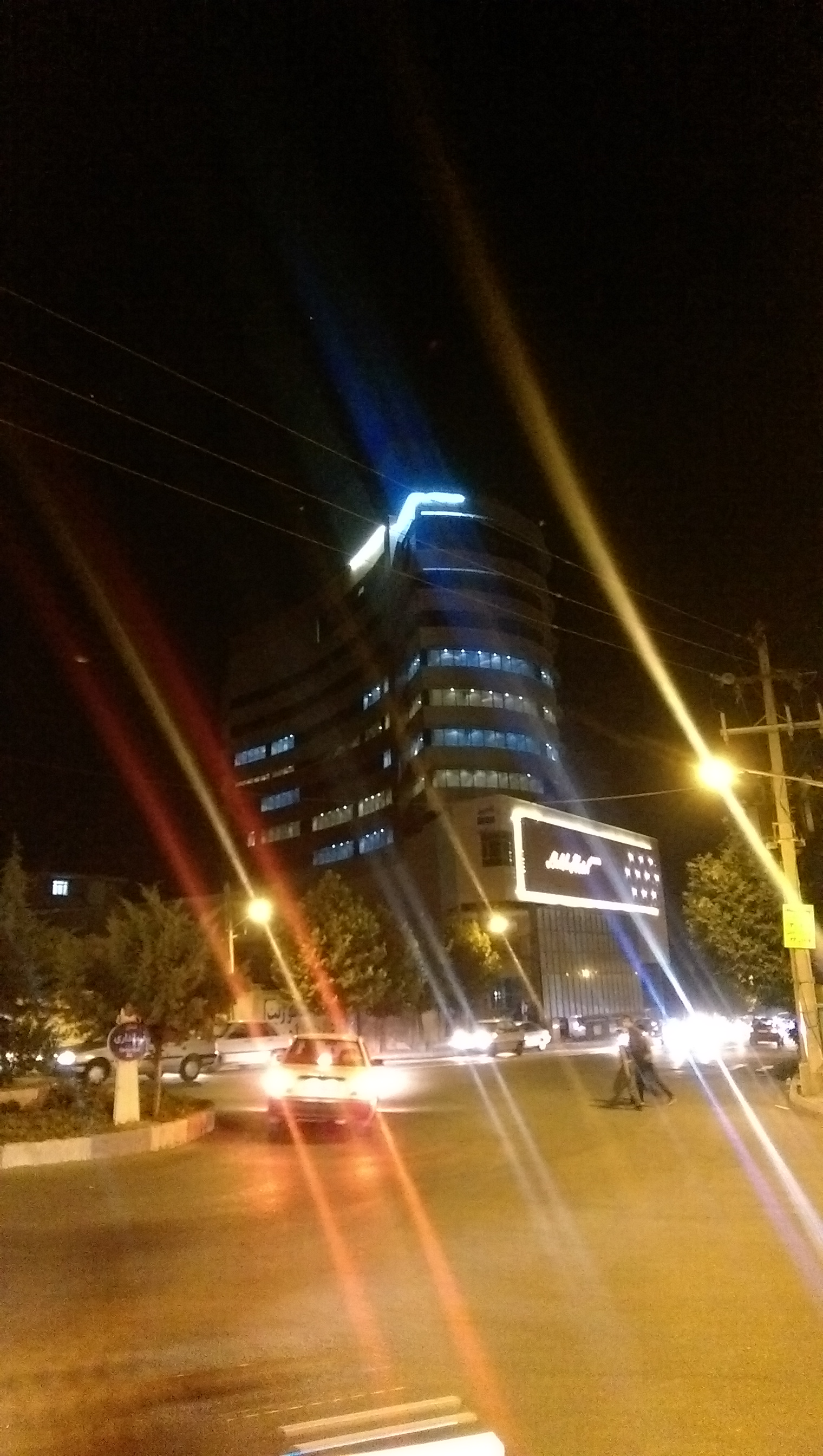
Haleh International 5-Star hotel

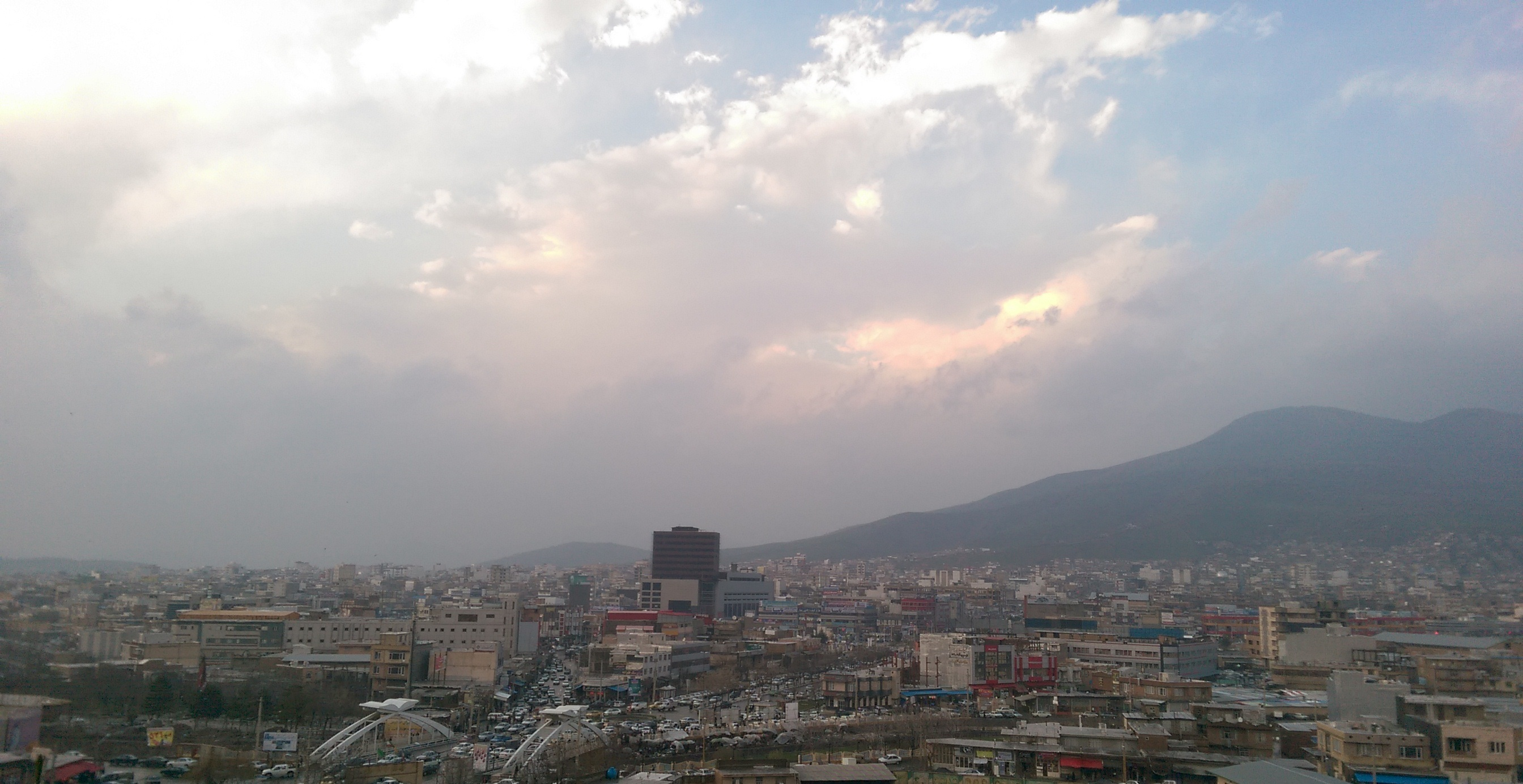
Behesht Shopping Center

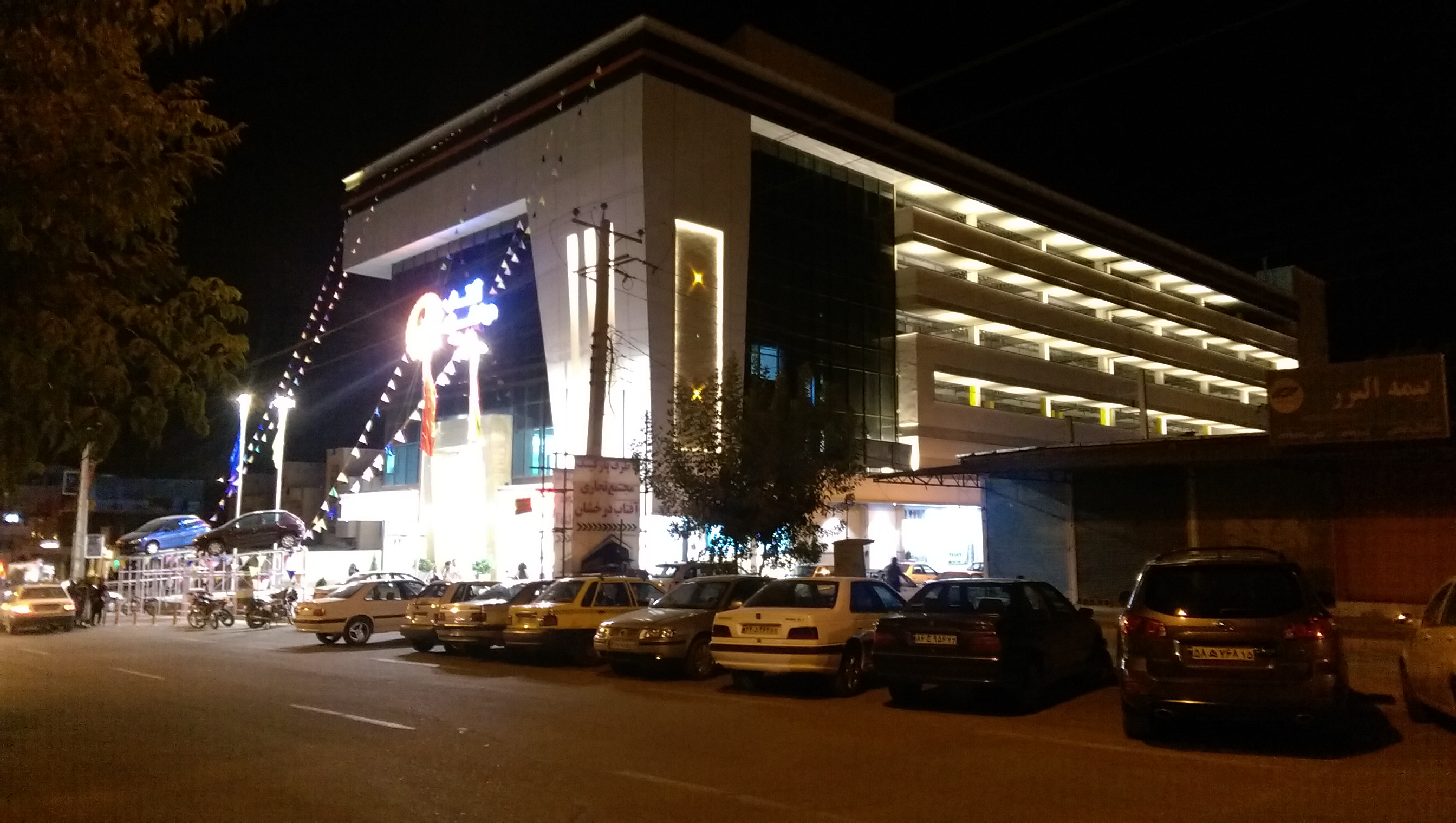
Aftab Derakhshan shopping center

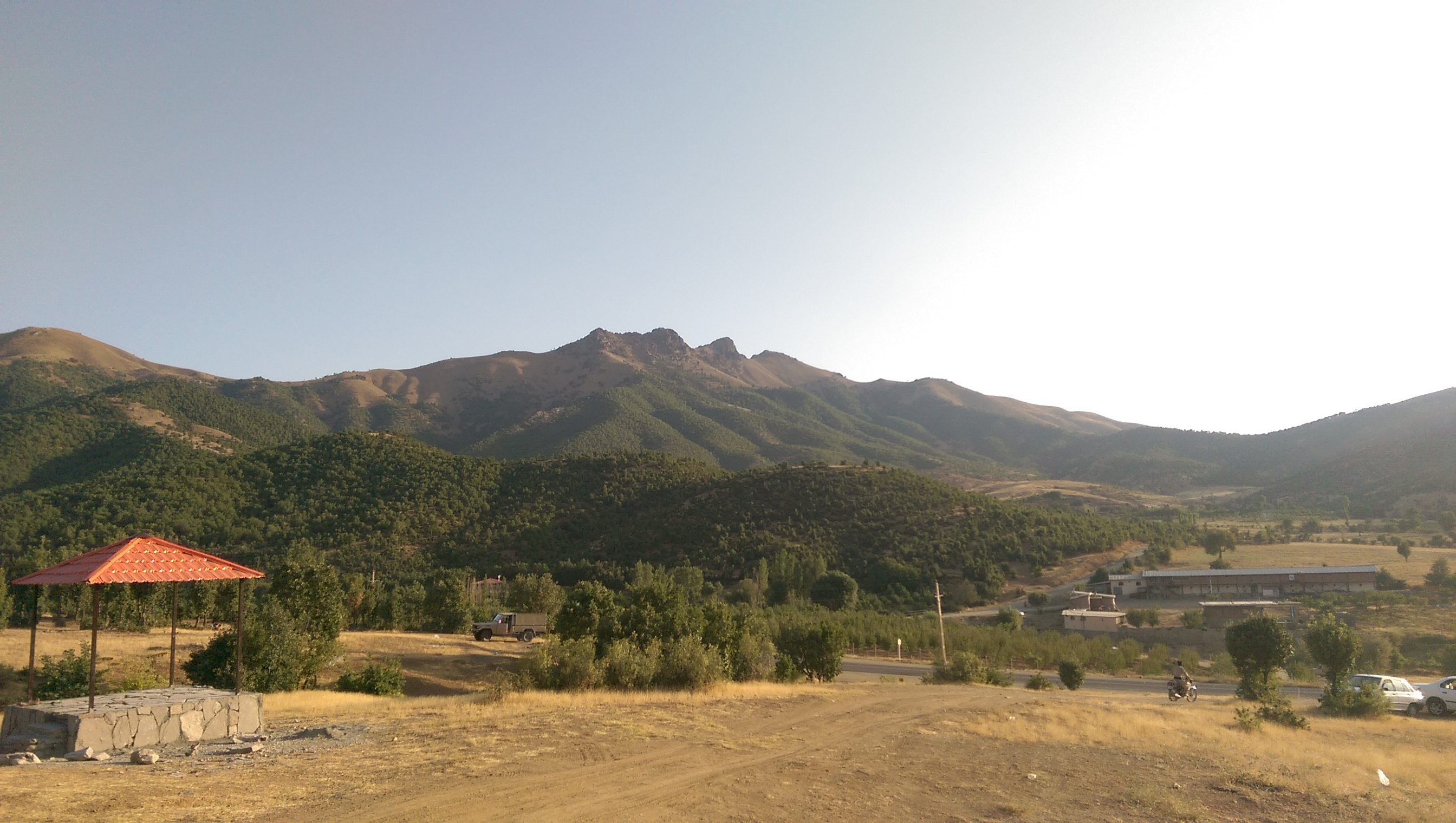
Sooren plain and forest

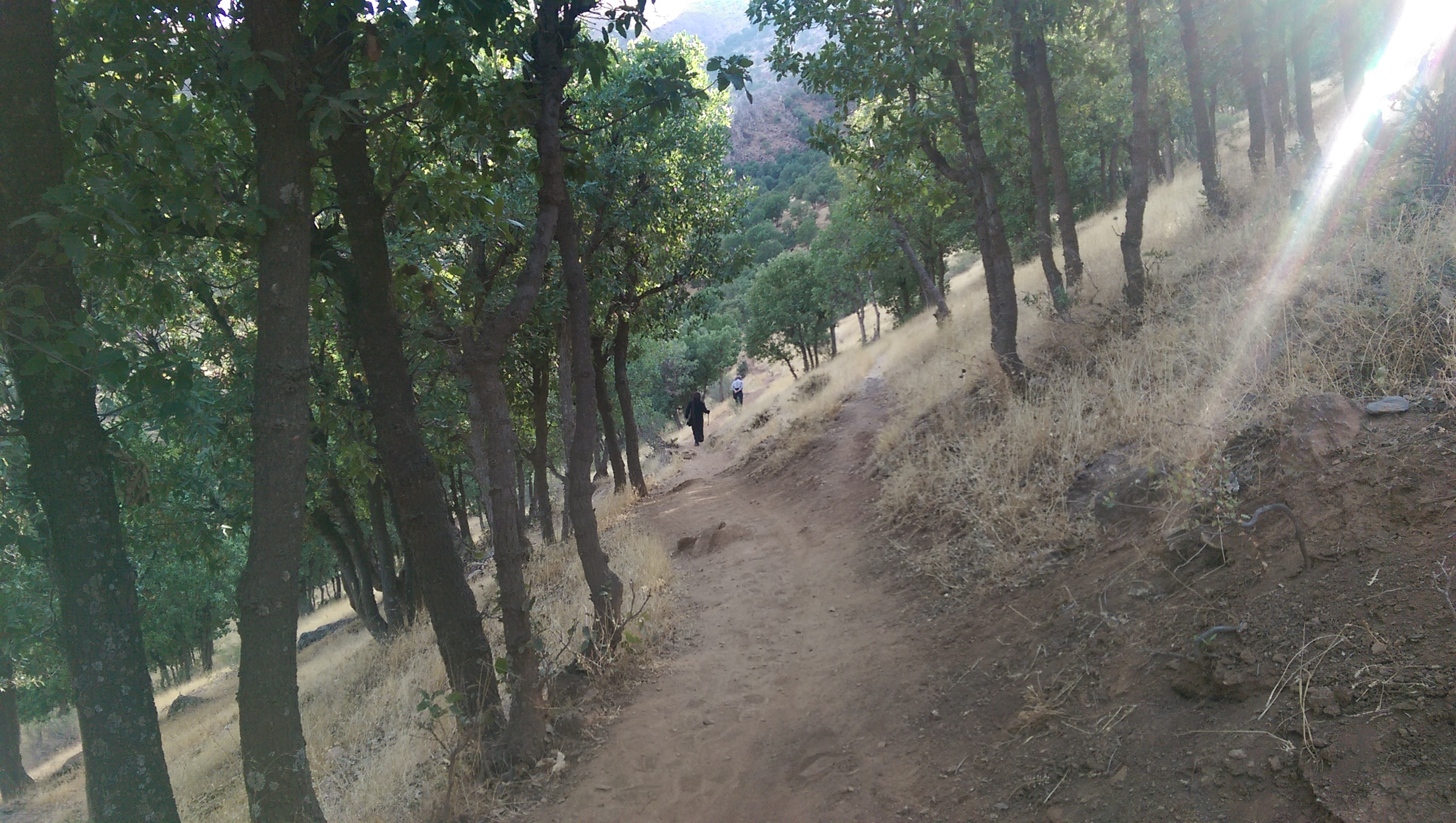
Arbaba forest

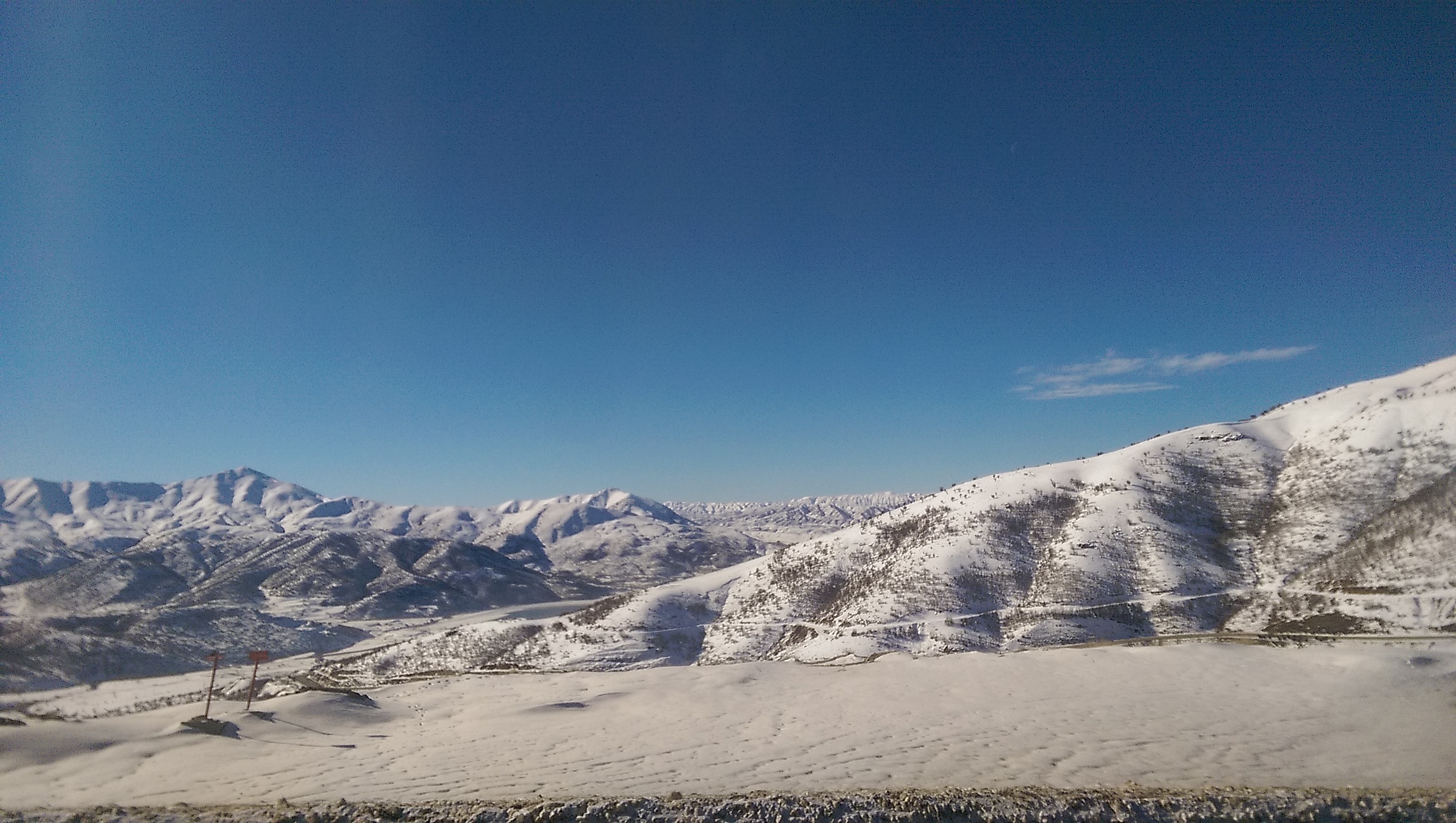
Snow covered Kali Khan

Media related to Baneh at Wikimedia Commons
