= The Kamkars =

Kamkars are a Kurdish musical family group, all from the city of Sanandaj, Kurdistan

The Kamkars Kurdish: کامکاران, Kamkaran, Persian: کامکارها
- Also known as: Kamkar Ensemble
- Origin: Sanandaj, Kurdistan, Iran
- Genres: Traditional Kurdish and Persian
- Years active: 1965–present
- Label: Various
- Members: Hooshang Kamkar; Bijan Kamkar; Pashang Kamkar; Ghashang Kamkar; Arsalan Kamkar; Arsalan Kamkar; Ardeshir Kamkar; Ardavan Kamkar; Maryam Ebrahimpour; Saba Kamkar; Amir Haghiri; Hanna Kamkar; Neyriz Kamkar; Omid Lotfi
- Past members: Hassan Kamkar
- Website: www.kamkars.net

The Kamkars (Kurdish: کامکاران, Kamkaran, Persian: کامکارها) is a Kurdish musical family group of seven brothers and a sister, all from the city of Sanandaj, the capital of the Kurdistan Province of Iran.

The group has performed numerous concerts around the world, including their performance at the 2003 Nobel Peace Prize ceremony honoring Shirin Ebadi.

After six years of absence, the Kamkars returned to the stage on 11 January 2024, with a concert titled Living Fire at Tehran's Espinas Hall. Blending Kurdish music, classical Iranian pieces, and global influences, the performance featured their signature fusion of traditional melodies with Western string and wind instruments.

== Group members ==
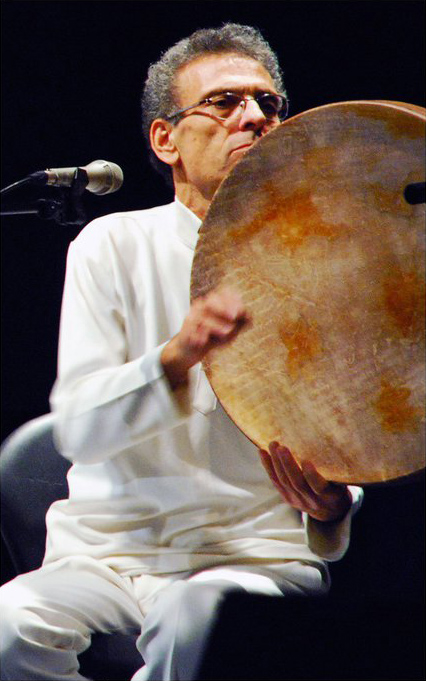
Bijan Kamkar

- Hooshang Kamkar - (director and composer of the group)
- Bizhan Kamkar - (lead singer and Tar, Rubab, Tombak, Dohol and Daf player)
- Pashang Kamkar - (Santoor player)
- Ghashang Kamkar - (Setar player)
- Arzhang Kamkar - (Tonbak player)
- Arsalan Kamkar - (Barbat, Oud and Violin player)
- Ardashir Kamkar - (Kamancheh and Ghaychak player)
- Ardavan Kamkar - (Santoor player)
- Najmeh Tajaddod - (vocalist)
- Maryam Ebrahimpour - (vocalist)
- Saba Kamkar - (vocalist)
- Hana Kamkar - (Daf)
- Neyriz Kamkar - (Tar player)
- Omid Lotfi - (Setar player)

== Discography ==
=== Albums ===
Year	Album	Notes
—	Zardie Khazan	
—	Baharan e Abidar	
—	In Memory of Hafez	
—	Shabahengam	
—	Baraneh	
—	Darya	
—	In Memory of Saba	
—	Afsaneh Sarzamine Pedari	
January 16, 1996	Living Fire	
March 11, 1997	Nightingale with a Broken Wing	
August 10, 1999	Chant of Drums	
August 17, 1999	Kani Sepi	
August 24, 1999	Music From Kurdistan	
?	Gol Nishan	
—	Biabane Bikaran	
—	Khorshid e Mastan	

=== Compilations ===
Title	Singer
Persheng	Abbas Kamandi
Ouraman	Abbas Kamandi
Nashakiba	Homayoun Shajarian
Emshow	Adnan Karim
Dar Golestane	Shahram Nazeri

== See also ==
- Kamkar
- Kurdish music
- Music of Iran
- Mastan Ensemble
- List of Iranian musicians
- Kurdistan Philharmonic Orchestra
- Shahrokh Hedayati
