= Siavash Kamkar =

Siavash Kamkar سیاوش کامکار
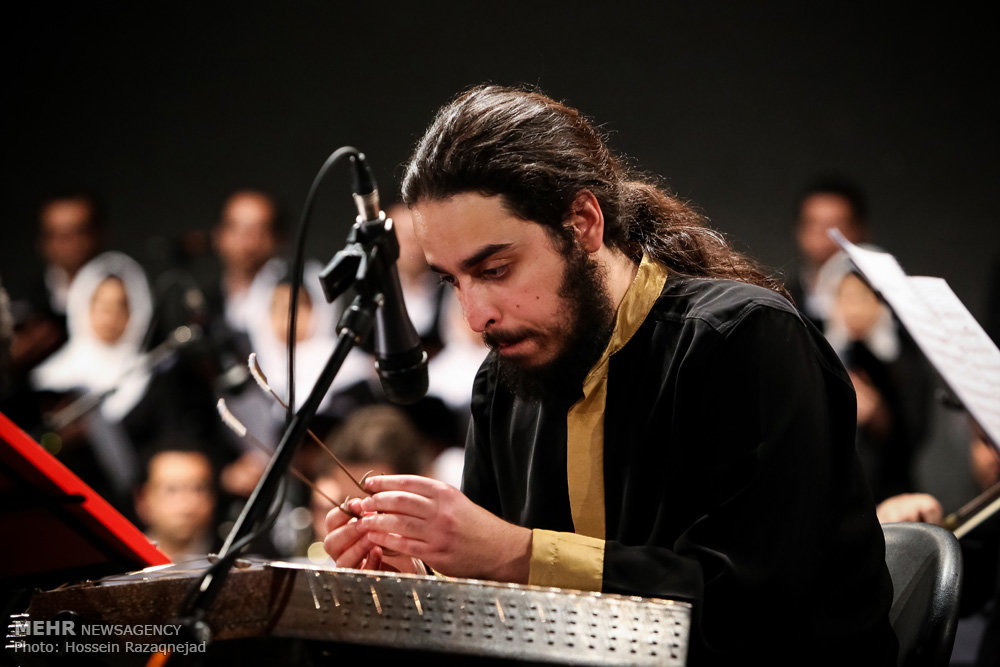
- Kamkar performing with the Alborz Symphony Orchestra in 2015

Background information
- Born: 2 November 1989 (age 37); Tehran, Iran
- Genre: Iranian classical music
- Occupations: Santur player, composer
- Instrument: Santur
- Website: siavashkamkar.com

Siavash Kamkar (Persian: سیاوش کامکار; born 2 November 1989). is an Iranian santur player and composer. A member of the Kamkar family of musicians, he has performed Iranian classical music as a soloist and ensemble musician and has led the Zhav ensemble.

== Early life and musical training ==
Kamkar began studying music on the tombak with his uncle Arjang Kamkar. He first learned santur from his mother, Soudabeh Salem, and later studied with his father, Pashang Kamkar, and his uncle Ardavan Kamkar.

== Career ==
In 2008, Kamkar performed a program for solo santur and santur with string quartet at Tehran’s Rudaki Hall. The program included his compositions Baghi Dar Seda and Sadeh Rang, as well as Baraneh by Pashang Kamkar. In 2013, he and Mahyar Toreihi presented a contemporary santur duet at the same venue, performing compositions by several members of the Kamkar family

Zhav was formed in 2011 and gave its first official performance in November 2012. Led by Kamkar, the ensemble released its debut album, Avaunt, in 2015 and performed at the 36th Fajr Music Festival in 2021.

In 2019, Kamkar performed in the Chand Shab Santur concert series at Rudaki Hall. In a review of the series, music critic Arvin Sedaghat Kish described Kamkar and Mahyar Toreihi as followers of Ardavan Kamkar's school of santur playing and discussed Kamkar's approach to dynamics and formal development.

In 2020, Kamkar co-authored Mezrab Dance, a collection of 22 pieces for contemporary santur, with Mahyar Toreihi and Mostafa Momenian.

Kamkar collaborated with Dutch drummer Martijn Soeterbroek. They released the album Dar Amalga in 2022 and the EP Az Zagros Ta Zuiderzee in 2024.

== Selected discography ==
Selected releases include:

- Barani Bar Darya
- From Waters Onward
- Baghi Dar Seda
- Avaunt
- A Glimpse into the Light
- Khalvat
- Dar Amalga
- Raam
- Improvisation in Homayoun
