= Alipour =

Alipour (Persian: علی‌پور or علیپور), or Alipoor, is a surname. Notable people with the surname include:

- Ali Alipour (born 1994), Iranian footballer
- Bijan Allipour (born 1949), Iranian business executive
- Ebrahim Alipoor
- Javaad Alipoor
- Reza Alipour (born 1994), Iranian speed climber
- Rozita Alipour (born 1989), Iranian karateka
