= Mazhar Khaleqi =

Mazhar Khaleghi مەزهەر خالقی
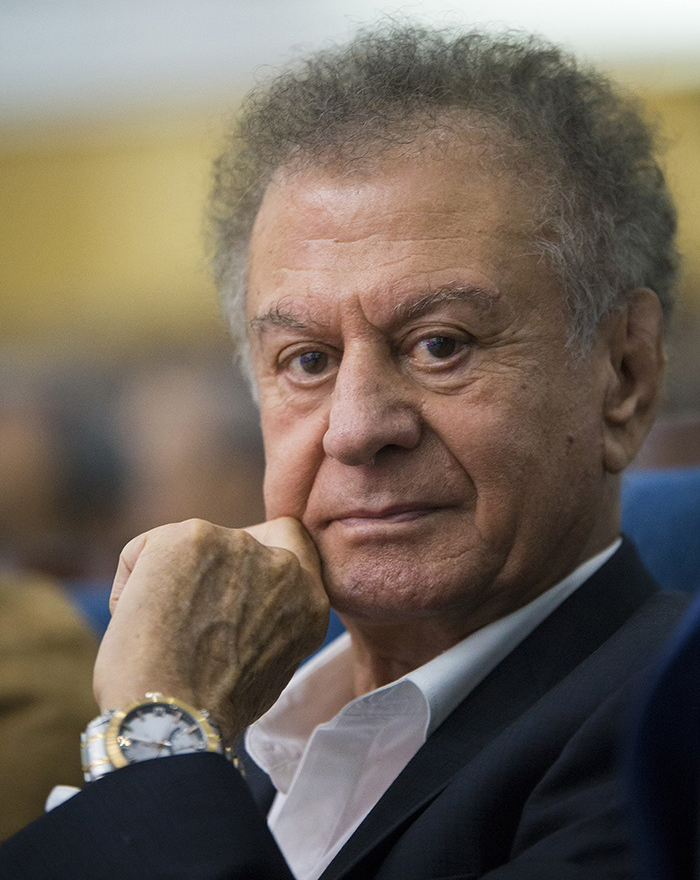
- Mazhar Khaleghi in July 2019

Background information
- Born: Mazhar Khaleghi; 9 September 1938 (age 88); Sanandaj, Iran
- Genres: Folk, Classical
- Occupation: Physicist
- Years active: 1948–1987

Mazhar Khaleghi (Persian: مظهر خالقی, Kurdish: مەزهەر خالقی; born 9 September 1938) is an Iranian Kurdish musician and singer, famous for his Kurdish folklore music. He currently resides in the United Kingdom.

== Biography ==
Khaleqi was born on 9 September 1938 in the city of Sanandaj, Iran. He started to sing when he was in primary school at the age of eight. The school music teacher gave him extra courses to teach him to read notes, and also learn Kurdish and Persian modes (Maqam). He got more music lessons from Kurdish master musician Hassan Kamkar, the father of the renowned musicians and performers, the Kamkars.

At the age of twelve, Mazhar was invited to sing on the town radio in Sanandaj. He soon became well known in all regions which were covered by radio signals. He performed weekly for nearly seven years. Unfortunately, all performances were live and there are no recordings except for a few from 1958.

Mazhar Khaleqi left his hometown to study at Tehran University in the summer of 1958. He started a new career with Radio Tehran. The rich Kurdish folksong and his background helped him to become close friends and collaborate with prominent Iranian composers and conductors such as Morteza Hannaneh, Yousefzamani, Mojtaba Mirzadeh, Ali Tajvidi, Kasravi, and Naseri.

He has recorded over 150 pieces of Kurdish classical and folk melodies with several types of orchestras, such as the Tehran Symphony Orchestra, the Iranian Cultural Ministry, and the Orchestras of Radio Tehran and Kermanshah (رادیو کردی کرمانشاه). He left Iran after the Iranian Revolution when any type of music not containing Islamic verses was declared sinful. Before leaving Iran he recorded an album of twelve songs for his people.

Khaleqi continued with music in exile and gave his nation hope and happiness in the time when Ba'athist Iraq started to commit genocide against the Kurds.

== Kurdish identity ==
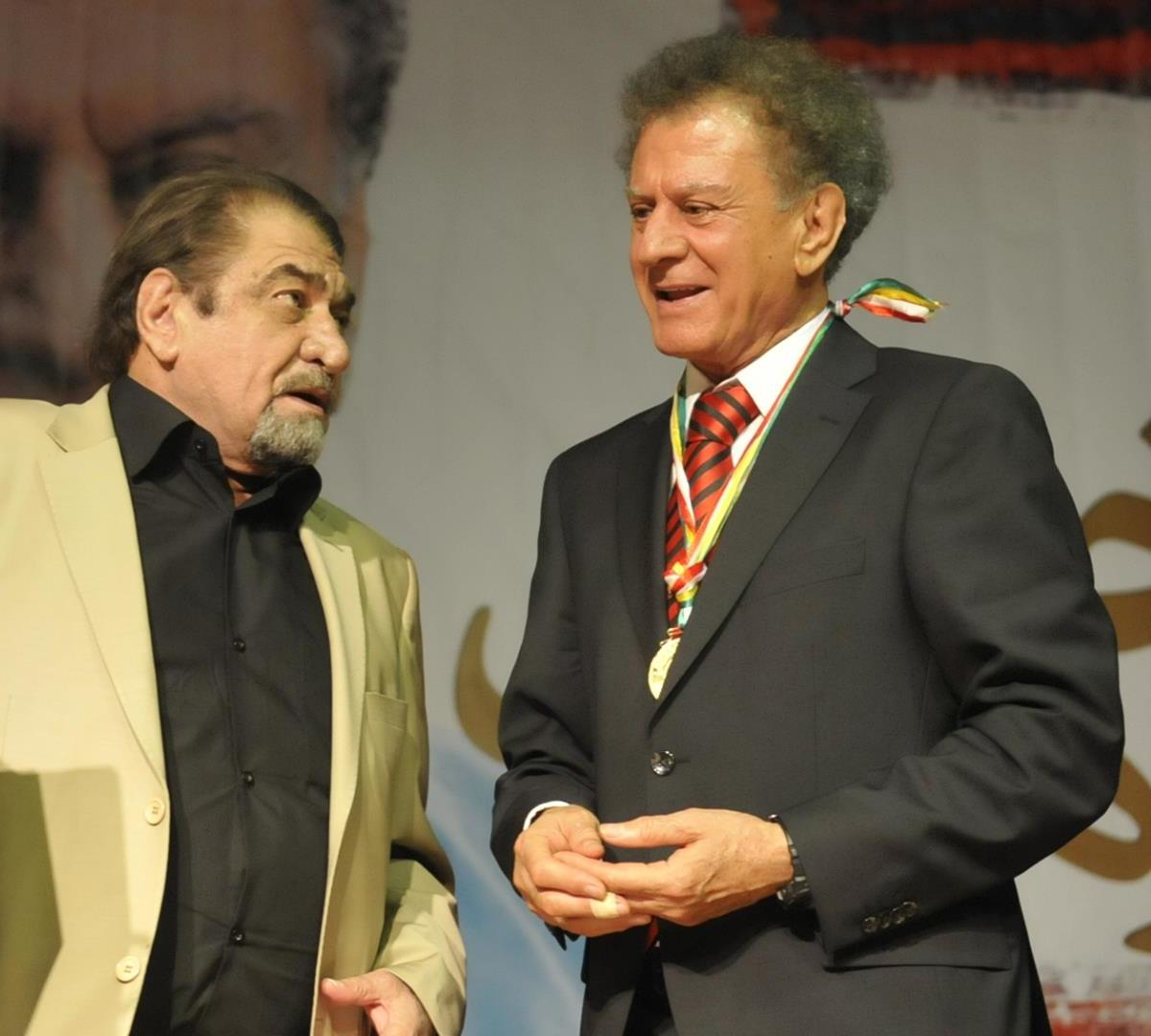
Khaleqi (right) and Sherko Bekas (left)

In reply to a question on how the Kurds can achieve their cultural and political rights within the four countries with a Kurdish population — Iran, Iraq, Syria and Turkey — Khaliqi said,

“Given globalization, it is inevitable that there will be compromises. I do not mean in political terms but in art and culture. We should not let our traditions fade away in the globalized world. On the contrary, we should use globalization and technology to take our music and our culture beyond the Middle East.”

== Books ==
Karavan-i Mihr (2001)

== See also ==
- Kurdish music
- Kurdish people
- List of Kurdish musical artists
