= Abbas Kamandi =

Abbas Kamandi عەباس کەمەندی
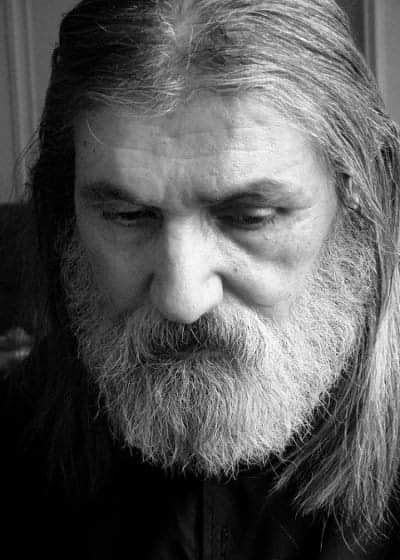

Background information
- Born: Abbas Ali Kamandi; May 5, 1952; Sanandaj, Iran
- Origin: Kurdish
- Died: May 22, 2014 (aged 62) Sanandaj, Iran
- Occupations: singer, songwriter, poet, writer, painter and film director
- Years active: ? – 2014

Abbas Kamandi (Kurdish: عەباس کەمەندی; May 05, 1952 – May 22, 2014) was a Kurdish singer, songwriter, poet, writer, painter, and film director. He won his first writing award for the best story at the age of 18.

He was born in Sanandaj and was the son of Ali Kamandi. He died at 62. Kamandi's music was popular and celebrated in Kurdish culture. He is remembered for his traditional songs and for advocating for Kurdish music.

== Discography/Works ==
=== Albums ===
- "Glavyzh"
- "Pershang / Music Ensemble: The Kamkars"
- "Ouraman / Music Ensemble: The Kamkars"
- "Kyzhy Kurd"

== Screenplays ==
- 1. Asb (Horse)
- 2. Yek Sabad Alaf (A grass basket)
- 3. Parvaz Dar Ghafas (Flying in the Cage)
- 4. Ersie Mame Rehim (Heritage of Mame Rehim)
- 5. Ozve Jadide OPEC (New Member of OPEC)
- 6. Nabarde Ramadie (Battle of Ramadie )
- 7. Koche Sorkh (Red Alley)
- 8. Vakil Aval (First Lawyer)
- 9. Ghalam o Sheytan (Pen and Satan)
- 10. Pahlavan Panbe (Panbe Champion)

== Programs produced ==
- 1. manzel nou mobarak
- 2. Puppet Show of pahlevan panbe
- 3.Documentary kona havaran (Introducing the Kurdistan Fame)

== Books ==
- 1. Kurdish and Persian Poetry
- 2. Poetry Collection of Mirza Shafi
- 3. The Ancient Sport of Kurdish Heroes
- 4. Biography of Seyed Ali Asghar Kurdistani
- 5. Hawraman
- 6. Decoding the Cultural Manifestations
- 7. Collection of Hejai Poetry Before Islam
