= Kurdish Language Academy in Iran =

Language academy in Iran

The Kurdish Language Academy in Iran is a school in Tehran, Islamic Republic of Iran, educating students on the Kurdish language. Kurdish is sociopolitically considered a single language; however the limited mutual intelligibility of its varieties means that it's a dialect continuum.

== Establishment ==
The Kurdish Language Academy in Iran was established in Tehran in 2002 when the First Conference on Kurdish Language Teaching was held in 2002. More than 150 Iranian Kurdish writers, academicians, linguists and journalists participated in this conference and a dozen of articles on the different aspects of Kurdish language were presented. The conference, though of no governmental support, was conducted by the Cultural Institute of Kurdistan in Tehran and Peyv Literary Community in Saghez. Based on the article fifteen of the Iranian Constitution, the Kurdish language is to be taught in the schools of Iranian Kurdistan. However, it Kurdish has never been taught in Iranian Kurdistan as of February 2019. The conference emphasized the necessity of the establishment of an academy for Kurdish language. Hence, based on the votes of the participants of the conference the members of the newly established Kurdish Language Academy in Iran were elected. The academy includes Fifteen staff members and five associate members.

== Objectives ==
Among the major objectives of the Kurdish Language Academy are the development of Kurdish language, paving the way for Kurdish language teaching in Iran in a formal and academic way, and motivating, as well as sponsoring, various attempts to improve and teach Kurdish language all over Iran.

== Zimanewan, the academy's journal ==
Kurdish Language Academy issues a quarterly journal called Zimanewan (The Linguist). It publishes analytical articles on the different aspects of Kurdish language, among which are the following:

- major Kurdish dialects including Sorani, Kurmanji, Gorani and Zazai
- all Kurdish sub-dialects and accents such as Erdelani, Mokriyani, Shikaki and Kelhuri
- the grammar of all Kurdish dialects and sub-dialects
- the process of word and term coinage in the Kurdish language
- language and identity
- language and culture
- philology
- phonetics
- critique of the non-scientific and immature works on Kurdish language.

== Members ==
The list of the Members according to the votes of the elections: 1. Ata Nahai 2. Ahmad Ghazi 3. Dr. Ali Rokhzadi 4. Dr. Aziz Jiyan 5. Kalimollah Tavahodi 6. Dr. Bakhtiar Sajjadi 7. Abdulkhaleq Yaghubi 8. Dr. Jalal Jalalizade 9. Kamran Rahim 10. Farugh Keikhosravi 11. Yusof Rasulabadi 12. Reza Shajei 13. Rashid Kermanj 13. Ahmad Bahri 14. Naser Vahid 15. Mansour Teifuri
