= Matthaios Tsahouridis =

Pontic Greek musician and composer

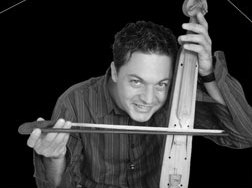
Matthaios Tsahouridis with his Pontic lyra, or kemenche

Matthaios Tsahouridis (Greek: Ματθαίος Τσαχουρίδης; Born 18 September 1978) is a Pontic Greek musician and composer who plays a range of stringed musical instruments. He was born in Veria, Greece, and started performing music at age 9. In both Greece and Turkey he is currently considered to be the best Pontic lyra (or Kemençe) violinist; he is lauded for his wide range of styles, innovation and fusion with other ethnic performers from around the globe. Matthaios is sometimes also referred to as Makos or simply Makoulis.

Tsahouridis plays string instruments such as the violin, laghouto (Greek lute), oud, the Greek bouzouki, guitar, the Persian kamancheh, the Afghan rubab, as well as the Afghan and Uzbek ghichaks.

== Education ==
Tsahouridis won the first prize in a Pan-Hellenic Music Competition organized by the Greek Ministry of Education at the Athens Concert Hall (Megaron Mousikis) in 1996. In 1997, he was awarded a scholarship by Panteleimon and Iera Mitropolis Verias, in order to continue his music studies in London.

In 2001 Tsahouridis completed his bachelor's degree in Music Studies and his Masters in Ethnomusicology at Goldsmiths College, University of London. In 2003 he was awarded a scholarship by the 'Michael Marks Charitable Trust' for his Doctoral research in the field of Performance Practice. He attained his PhD in 2007, titled: 'The Pontic lyra in contemporary Greece', the first doctorate in the U.K. referring to the performance of non-western music cultures.

== Performances ==
He performed the Pontic lyra at WOMAD music festival in Reading (2001, 2005), WOMEX music festival in Rotterdam (2001), Roskilder Rock festival (2002), in Teatro Massimo for UNESCO (Palermo Opera House, Italy 2002), at the Royal Albert Hall (2002) and at the Purcell Room in London's Southbank Arts Centre. He performed the Pontic lyra for BBC Radio 3, as well as in many other BBC radio programmes. He was one of the performers of the main music theme of the BBC for the Olympic Games of Athens with the opera band Amici and Prague Symphony Orchestra. He also collaborated with Ostad Ardeshir Kamkar on the Persian kamancheh in Tehran in 2004. In 2005, he performed at Herodus Atticus Theatre in Acropolis, Athens, accompanied by ERT Contemporary Music Orchestra in the opening ceremony of the Athens Festival and in June 2005 he performed in the Oratorio ‘Kosmas o Aitolos' (by Mimis Plessas) in Veria, Greece. In 2006 Matthaios was the co-artistic director of the opening ceremony for the International Byzantine Congress of London with Lady Marina Marks as Chairman and Prince Charles as patron. In March 2007 he performed at the London Porchester Hall(Bayswater) with Cat Stevens (Yusuf Islam). In 2010 he performed on the Kadirga Festival in the Pontic Mountains of Trabzon, Turkey. Since then he has cooperated with multiple local Pontic Greek musicians from Turkey.
