= Zhina Modares Gorji =

Iranian book seller

- Other name: Jina
- Education: Islamic Azad University
- Occupation: book seller
- Known for: imprisoned for speaking freely

Zhina (or Jina) Modares Gorji is an Iranian book seller, and feminist podcaster in the city of Sanandaj. She has been imprisoned for sedition and she is a human rights cause celebre. She was included in the BBC's 100 inspiration women in 2024.

== Life ==
Gorji is a Kurdish woman who was working as a book seller in the Iranian city of Sanandaj.

She was first arrested in September 2022. In June 2023, she was informed that there were further changes and she was banned from taking her university exams in sociology at the local Islamic Azad University.

In May 2024 Gorji learned that she had been sentenced by the Sanandaj Revolutionary Court to twenty-one years in jail. She was to serve ten years for "collaboration with a hostile government"; another ten for "forming groups and association with the intention of disturbing the national security" and an extra year for "propaganda activities against the state". This sentence was reduced on appeal to 28 months.

Gorji's case was taken up by Mary Lawlor who is the United Nations' Special Rapporteur on Human Rights. Lawlor believes that the charges against her arise from Gorji's legitimate activities of encouraging girls to form book groups and to write blogs. She and others have written to the Iranian authorities to raise their concerns. The case was also championed by the human right's groups of Hengaw, the Coalition For Women In Journalism and Frontline Defenders and she was included in the BBC's list of 100 inspirational women in 2024.

Gorji was released from prison on 22 September 2025.
