= Omid Kamkar Lotfi =

Iranian musician (born 1977)

Omid Lotfi Kamkar is an Iranian setar and daf player. He is a classical Persian ensemble musician and he tours the world with The Kamkars, an Iranian Kurdish group composed of Omid, his seven uncles, and his mother. He has also toured with his musician father, Mohammad Reza Lotfi.

Omid was born in the city of Tehran, Iran, in 1977, and studied music at the early age of five under the supervision of his family The kamkars. His focus at first was on the contemporary Iranian music, but later at the age of 20 he studied the traditional repertoire, the Radif.

Omid was deeply inspired by his uncle Ardavan Kamkar and his father Mohammad-Reza Lotfi . Omid started his performing career in 1993 at Vahdat Auditorium of Iran. He has performed regularly in Iran and throughout the world.

Besides his musical career, Omid has had a lifelong passion for vipassana meditation. Since 1997, he has practiced vipassana meditation under the instructions of S. N. Goenka.

As a member of The Kamkars, Omid has given numerous concerts in Iran and abroad.
