= Ahmad Ghazi =

Kurdish writer and translator

Ahmad Ghazi (28 June 1936 – 7 June 2015) was a Kurdish writer and translator. He was born in 1936 in Mahabad. He received his Bachelor of Arts degree in English in Tehran Higher Institute of Languages in 1958. He played an active role in Iranian Kurdistan struggles for political sovereignty in the 1970s, because of which he was imprisoned under Shah's rule for four years. After the Iranian Revolution of 1979, he managed himself to write and translate literary and historical works both in Kurdish and Persian. He was the editor in Chief of Sirwe, a then popular cultural and literary magazine in Kurdish, from 1986 to 2006. He was also a selected member of the Kurdish Language Academy in Iran.

== Published books ==
- A translation of Ubayd Zakani's Moosh o Gorbe (The Mouse and the Cat) into Kurdish, Mahabad, Seyediyan, 1982.

- Desturi Zibani Kurdi (A Grammar of Kurdish Language), both in Kurdish and Persian, Urumieh, Salahadin Publishers, 1988.

- A translation of Mark Twain's Those Extraordinary Twins into Kurdish, Urumieh, Salahadin Publishers, 1990.

== Major Kurdish Essays in Sirwe Magazine ==
- A Criticism of Kurdish Orthography, Vol.I, No. 3, pp. 14–9.

- The Image of Woman in Kurdish Poetry, Vol. VI, No. 52, pp. 45–54.

- Blank Verse and Kurdish Poetry, Vol. VII, No. 64, pp. 41–5.

- A Comparative Study of Sorani and Laki Dialects of Kurdish, Vol. IX, No. 88, pp. 32–6.

- A journey into the Poetic World of Maref Aghaiee, Vol. XIV, No. 51, pp. 30–5.

- A New Attitude at two Poems by Mahwi, Vol. XV, No. 164, pp. 14–9.

- Mastoureh Ardalan and Kurdish Poetry, Vol. XVI, No. 168, 34-9.

== Translated works ==
Ahmad Ghazi has translated a large number of historical works from English and Persian into Kurdish. The frequently-referred titles of these works are Mehrdad Izadi's Genealogy of Kurdish Tribes and Jamshid Sedaghatkish's The Kurds of Pars. Ahmad Ghazi
