= Brayim Younisi =

Brayim Younisi Baneh
- ئیبراھیم یوونسی
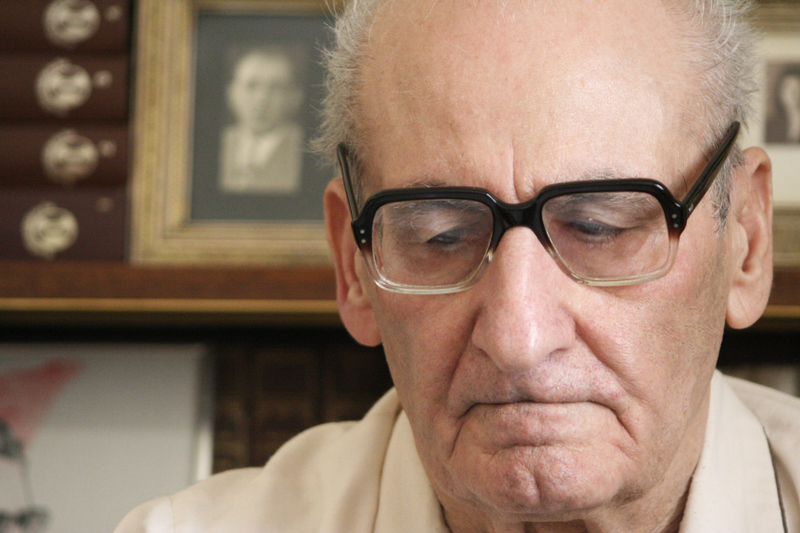
- Brayim Younisi
- Born: 1926; Baneh, Kurdistan Province, Iran
- Died: February 8, 2012 (aged 85–86)
- Other names: Ebrahim Younesi, Ibrahim Younisi, Brayim Khan
- Citizenship: Iran
- Education: Sorbonne University
- Occupations: Writer, Novelist, Translator
- Era: 20th century
- Known for: Translations, Kurdish literature, Persian novels
- Notable work: "Winter and no spring after", "Stranger Cemetery", "A Pray For the Ārman"
- Style: Kurdish, Persian literature, Translation

Brayim Younisi Baneh (1926 – February 8, 2012; Sorani Kurdish: ئیبراھیم یوونسی ,Kurdish: Îbrahîm Yûnisî, Persian: ابراهیم یونسی, alternatively spelled Ibrahim Younisi or Ebrahim Younesi or Brayim Khan) was an Iranian Kurdish writer, novelist, and translator.

== Biography ==
Brayim was born in Bana (Baneh) in Kurdistan province, Iran. He translated 81 books, mostly from English and a few from French literature into Persian. He has also authored more than 10 books. Although he was writing in Persian language, many of his books have been written in the Sorani Kurdish context and topics. In 1949 in Tehran he went to military school and became a lieutenant. After Mohammad Mosaddegh was overthrown in a coup d'état in 1955 he was fired from the Iranian army and sentenced to death. However, he was forgiven and eventually spent 8 years in jail under the Pahlavi regime (Shah). After jail he went to a higher school of economy and received a doctorate of philosophy from the Sorbonne in 1978 in Economy.

=== Autobiography ===
Brayim wrote an autobiography in 2005, collecting memories from the beginning of his life, and marking challenging issues in his life in a beautifully written novel called Winter and no spring after (Persian: زمستان بی‌بهار). In his book, he described the way of living for Kurdish people in the 1920s in his hometown in Bane which is a very small town hidden in the beautiful Zagros Mountains. Using memories in the book can also track events in the 20th century in Iran.

=== Lifetime activities ===
He started his first translation about half a century ago by translating the novel Great Expectations from Charles Dickens. He introduced many of the most important novels from western literature for the first time into Persian: Literature and Western man by Priestley, John Boynton and Aspects of the Novel by E. M. Forster. However his writings are not only limited to literature. He also published books in history and politics. His very important publications on the Kurds and Kurdistan are among the most respected books in Kurdology. For example: A Modern History of the Kurds: Third Edition by David McDowall and KURDS TURKS & ARABS by C. J. Edmonds.

Another strength of Brayim is his own written novels, many of which have been published multiple times in Iran. The images he has created in his book گورستان غريبان (Stranger Cemetery) and دعا برای آرمن (A Pray For the Ārman) are remarkable in the Kurdish and Iranian novel writings history.

His death on 7 February 2012, almost on the same day as 200th birthday anniversary of Charles Dickens is noticeable, while he translated a few of his books such as A Tale of Two Cities.

=== Political life ===
He was the first governor of the Kurdistan province in Iran's first government after the Iranian Revolution of 1979 in Mehdi Bazargan's cabinet.

== Books ==
=== Writings ===
1. هنر داستان‌نویسی, Honar-e dāstān-nevisi (1962)
2. گورستان غریبان, Gurestān-e gharib (1979, novel)
3. دلداده‌ها, Deldāde-hā (1993, novel)
4. دعا برای آرمن, Do'ā barāye Ārman (1998, novel)
5. مادرم دو بار گریست, Mādaram do bār gerist (1998, novel)
6. خوش آمدی, Xoš āmadi (2002, novel)
7. زمستان بی‌بهار, Zemestān-e bi-bahār (2003, novel)
8. شکفتن باغ, Šekoftan-e bāgh (2004, novel)
9. اندوه شب بی‌پایان, Anduh-e šab-e bi-pāyān
10. دادا شیرین, داده شیرین, Dādā Širin / Dāda Širin (novel)
11. جنگ سایه‌ها و یک داستان دیگر, Jang-e sāye-hā va yek dāstān-e digar
12. کج‌کلاه و کولی, Kaj-kolāh va kowli (novel)
13. رؤیا به رؤیا, Ro'yā be ro'yā

==== Translations ====
1. آرزوهای بزرگ - چارلز دیکنز (۱۳۳۶)
2. ادبیات آفریقا
3. تاریخ ادبیات یونان - رز هربرت جنینگز
4. تکیه‌گاه - درایز تودور
5. قیام شیخ سعید پیران - اولسن رابرت
6. کردها و کردستان - درک کینان
7. تاریخ معاصر کرد
8. جنبش ملی کرد - کریس کوچرا کرد شناس فرانسوی
9. هنر نمایشنامه نویسی
10. طوفان - ویلیام شکسپیر
11. جنبه‌های رمان
12. اگر بیل استریت زبان داشت
13. کردها ترکها عربها - سیسل جی ادموندز
14. یک جفت چشم آبی - توماس هاردی
15. به دور از مردم شوریده - تامس هاردی
16. جود گمنام - تامس هاردی
17. موسیقی و سکوت - رز تره مین
18. بازگشت بومی - تامس هاردی
19. گشتی در کردستان ترکیه - شرین لیزر
20. مردی که خورشید را در دست داشت - جک ریموند جونز
21. مسله کرد و روابط ایران و ترکیه - السن رابرت
22. با این رسوایی چه بخشایشی - رندل جاناتان
23. علامتچی - چارلز دیکنز
24. داستان دو شهر - چارلز دیکنز
25. چارلز دیکنز - هاردی باربارا
26. دفتر یادداشت روزانه یک نویسنده - فئودور میخایلویچ داستایفسکی
27. کردها - مصطفی نازدار
28. اسپارتاکوس - فاست هوارد
29. جامعه‌شناسی مردم کرد (آغا، شیخ و دولت) - مارتین وان براینِسِن
30. جنبش ملی کرد - کریس کوچرا
31. زندگانی و عقاید آقای تریسترام شندی - استرن لارنس
32. دست تکیده - تامس هاردی
33. تاریخ اجتماعی هنر - هاوز آرنولد
34. سیری در ادبیات غرب - پریستلی، جان بوینتن
35. تاریخ ادبیات روسیه - میرسکی سی دی
36. میراث شوم - گیسینگ جورج (۱۳۷۱)
37. لینمارا، عشق و آرزو - گاسکین کاترین
38. زن شیشه‌ای
39. آشیان عقاب - هون کنستانس
40. تامس هاردی - لویس سی دی
