= Darya Bon =

Darya Bon دريابن
- Village
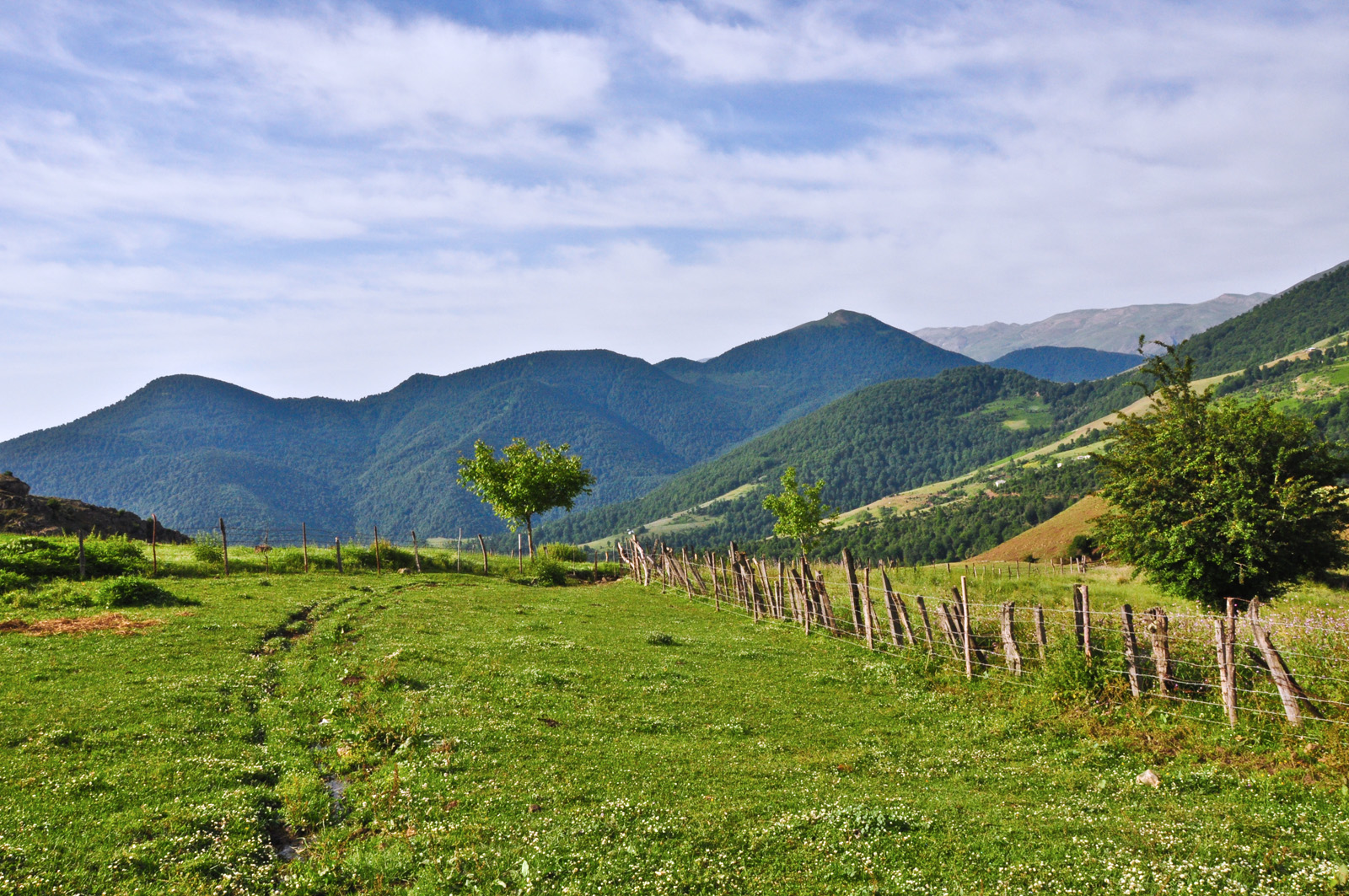
- Darya Bon Landscape

- Location within Iran
- Coordinates: 37°40′47″N 48°44′18″E
- Country: Iran
- Province: Gilan
- County: Talesh
- Bakhsh: Asalem
- Rural District: Kharajgil

Population (2016)
  - Total: 45
- Time zone: UTC+3:30 (IRST)

Darya Bon (Persian: دريابن, also Romanized as Daryā Bon) is a village in Kharajgil Rural District, Asalem District, Talesh County, Gilan Province, Iran. At the 2016 census, its population was 45, in 14 families. Decreased from 100 people in 2006.
