= Mohammad Reza Tafazzoli =

Iranian composer (born 1974)

Mohammad Reza Tafazzoli (born 1974) is an Iranian composer.

== Career ==
Mohammad Reza Tafazzoli was born in 1974 in Karlsruhe, Germany. He started his musical education in the Boys Conservatory of Tehran and graduated in 1992. Before leaving for Russia in 2002 he graduated from the Music Academy in Azad University of Arts and Architecture.

He studied composition in the Rimsky-Korsakov State Conservatory of Music in Saint Petersburg, under Boris Tishchenko, a pupil of Dmitri Shostakovich and a prominent figure in the Saint Petersburg school of composition. He studied Polyphony and Musical Form and Analysis with Anatoli Milka and Igor Rogalev.

He returned to Iran in 2007 soon after obtaining his Diploma With Honor from the conservatory.

Tafazzoli is now teaching in art universities in Iran including Tehran University of Art, Azad University of Art and Architecture, and Tehran University.

== Works ==
=== Orchestral works ===
- "Chavosh March" for Orchestra (1996)
- "Epigraph" for Orchestra (1997)
- Theme and Variations for String Orchestra (2003)
- Symphony No. 1 (2004-2006)

=== Chamber works ===
- Woodwind Quartet (2002)
- Sonata for Cello and Piano (2003)
- Quartet (2004)
- Elegy for Violin and Piano (2005)
- Ballad for Flute and Piano (2012)

=== Works for voice, choir and orchestra ===
- Symphonic Tasnif "Beloved's Ringlet" for Solo Singer, Male-voice Choir and Orchestra based on the poem by Khaju Kermani (1999)
- Symphonic Cantata "In Memory of Mosaddegh" for Choir, Basso Solo and Orchestra based on the poem by Mehdi Akhavan-Saless (2007-2008)

=== Piano works ===
- Two Valses for Piano (1998)
- Funeral March (2001)
- Interlude (1999)
- Romance (2003)
- Sonata for Piano (2009)
- Five Choral Miniatures (2011)
- Three Chorales on Sa'eb's Poetry (2012)
- On Worshiping the Truth
- Poem (2014)

=== Guitar music ===
- Zenitchikov Dormitory (2011)
