= Living Fire =

Brazilian band

- Origin: São Paulo, Brazil
- Genres: Christian hardcore, hardcore punk, pop punk, punk rock
- Years active: 2006–present
- Label: Thumper Punk
- Members: Luis Carlos; Wesley Farina; Murillo Xavier; Michel Oliveira
- Website: facebook.com/livingfireband

Living Fire is a Brazilian Christian hardcore band, hailing from São Paulo, Brazil, formed in 2006. Their first studio album, Jesus Rules, was released in 2012 by Thumper Punk Records. The subsequent album, Dead to Sin, was also released by Thumper Punk Records, in 2014.

== Background ==
Living Fire is a Christian hardcore band from the areas of São Paulo, Brazil. Their members are lead vocalist and bassist, Luis Carlos, guitarists, Wesley Farina and Murillo Xavier, and drummer, Michel Oliveira.

== Music history ==
The band commenced as a musical entity on June 5, 2006, with their first release, Jesus Rules, being a studio album, that was released by Thumper Punk Records on May 14, 2012. The subsequent studio album, Dead to Sin, was released by Thumper Punk Records on August 30, 2014.

== Members ==
Current members

- Luis Carlos - lead vocals, bass
- Wesley Farina - guitar
- Murillo Xavier - guitar
- Michel Oliveira - drums

== Discography ==
Studio albums

- Jesus Rules (May 14, 2012, Thumper Punk)
- Dead to Sin (August 30, 2014, Thumper Punk)
