= Darya Pur Kalan =

- Village
- Location in India
- Coordinates: 28°48′45″N 77°00′35″E
- Country: India
- Union Territory: Delhi
- District: North West

Population (2011)
  - Total: 6,310

Languages
  - Official: Hindi, English
  - Unofficial: Haryanvi
- Time zone: UTC+5:30 (IST)

Darya Pur Kalan (1329) is a village in North West district in the Indian territory of Delhi.

== Demography ==
In the 2011 census, Darya Pur Kalan had 1,143 houses with a population of 6,310, consisting of 3,342 males and 2,968 females. The population of children aged 0–6 was 825, making up 13.07% of the total population of the village. The average sex ratio was 888 out of 1000, which is higher than the state average of 868 out of 1000. The child sex ratio in the village was 759 out of 1000, which is lower than the average of 871 out of 1000 in the territory of Delhi. The total Scheduled Castes and Scheduled Tribes population in the town was 1,443 people and all were Scheduled Castes. There are no people of the Scheduled Tribe in the town.
