= Ebrahim Alipoor =

Iranian-Kurdish photographer (born 1989)

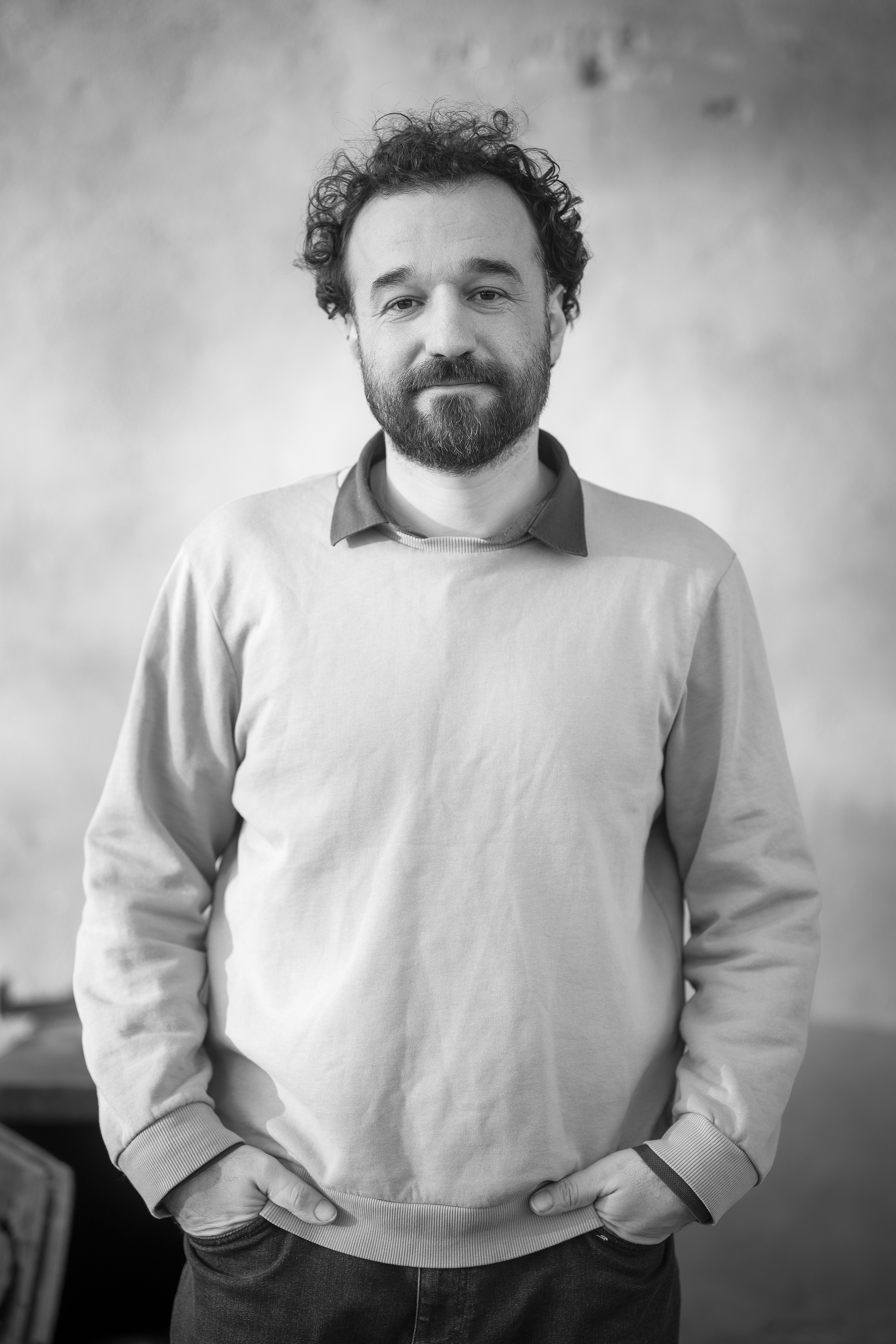
- Born: Baneh, Iran
- Education: Bachelor of science
- Occupation: Photographer
- Awards: Several awards including Picture of the Year Asia 2024
- Website: https://ebrahimalipoor.com/

Ebrahim Alipoor (Persian: ابراهیم علی پور) (Kurdish: ئیبراھیم عەلیپوور) (1990) is a Kurdish photographer. His work focuses on social issues, cultural heritage, and underreported communities, especially in the Middle East.

== Life ==
He (born on 4 September 1990 in Baneh, Kurdistan province) is an Iranian Kurdish photographer and documentary filmmaker. Alipoor's work focuses on storytelling through photography, exploring social and political issues under challenging circumstances. He views photography as a powerful medium to engage audiences, particularly in regions like Iran, where governmental restrictions and censorship pose significant challenges. Despite these limitations, he seeks to connect with people and inspire change through his work. He is a member of the VII Mentor Program and has received international recognition for his work.

== Work ==
Alipoor's photography has been exhibited internationally and has won several awards including Asia Portraits 2024, World Press Photo 2025. He has contributed to several films and made three documentaries.

== Awards and nominations ==
Alipour's works have won several awards some of which are listed below.

- Winner, World Press Photo 2025
- Winner, POY Asia Portraits, 2024
- Winner, Canon Grand Prize CSDP, 2023
- Nominated of Excellence, The Alexia Grant
- Allard Prize Photography Competition Winner, 2022
- Joop Swart Masterclass Nominee, 2024
