= Darya Sar =

Darya Sar or Daryasar (Persian: درياسر) may refer to:

- Daryasar, Gilan
- Darya Sar, Mazandaran
- Darya Sar, Fereydunkenar, Mazandaran Province
- Daryasar Rural District, in Gilan Province
