= Kamkar =

Kamkar (Persian and Arabic spelling: کامکار ) is a Persian surname. It consists of two binding words Kam, translated to "success" or "luck" and Kar, translated to "work" or "business". The meaning of the surname Kamkar is "Successful" but could also be interpreted to "Successful in his/her actions or career".

Notable people with the surname include:

- Kamkar Companies, a diversified holding company headquartered in New York City
- The Kamkars, musical ensemble in Iran
- Mohammad Kamkar, first Iranian Nuclear Medicine physician. Specialized in Internal medicine, Cardiology and Nuclear Medicine from Harvard and Johns Hopkins universities in United States, and Shiraz University, Shiraz
- Samy Kamkar, American privacy and security researcher, computer hacker, whistleblower and entrepreneur
- Mariam Kamkar, Professor in Software Engineering and Head of the Department of Computer and Information Science, Linköping University, Sweden
