= Sanandaj =

City in Kurdistan province, Iran

Sanandaj سنە (Kurdish) سنندج (Persian)
- City
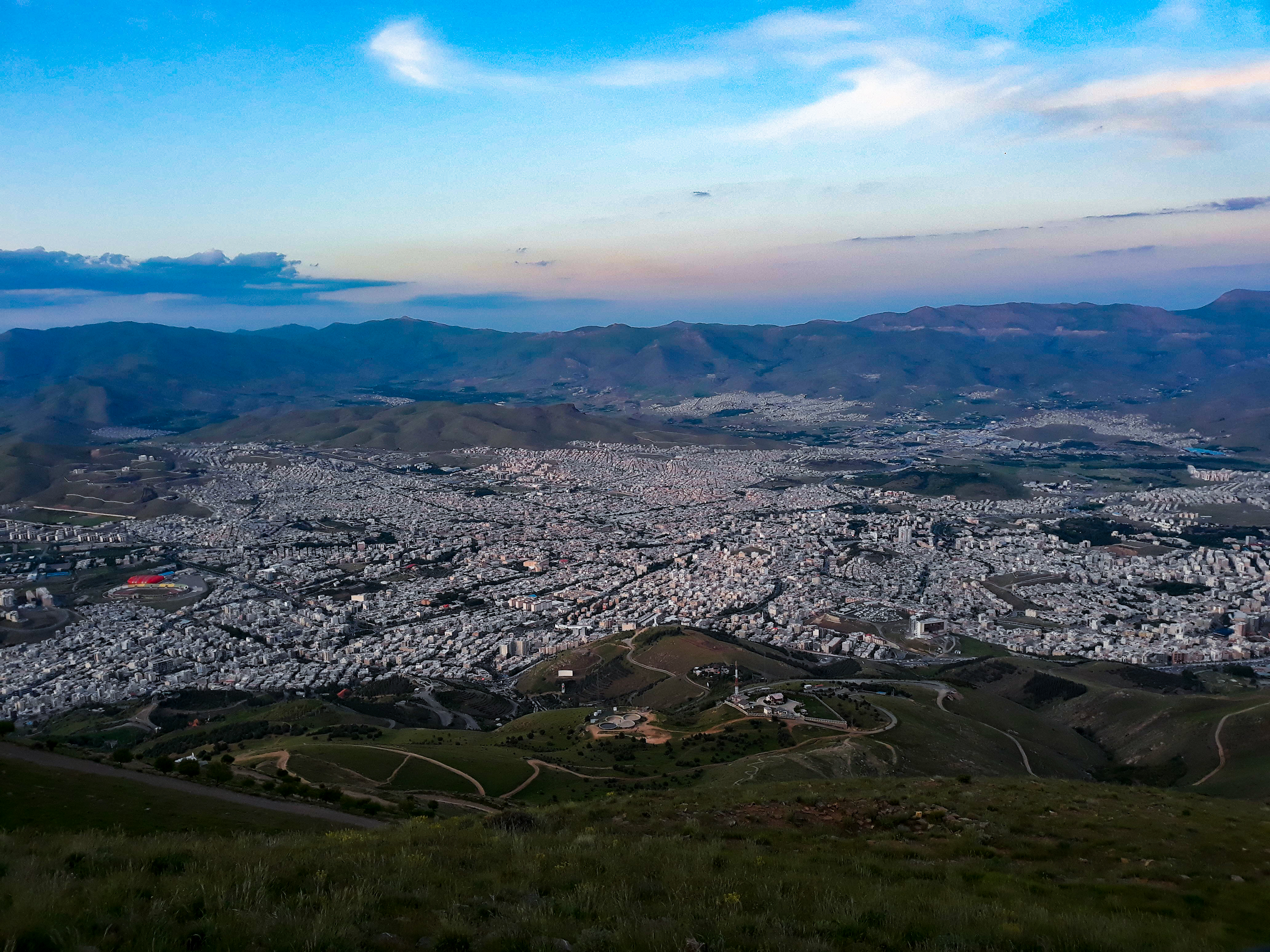
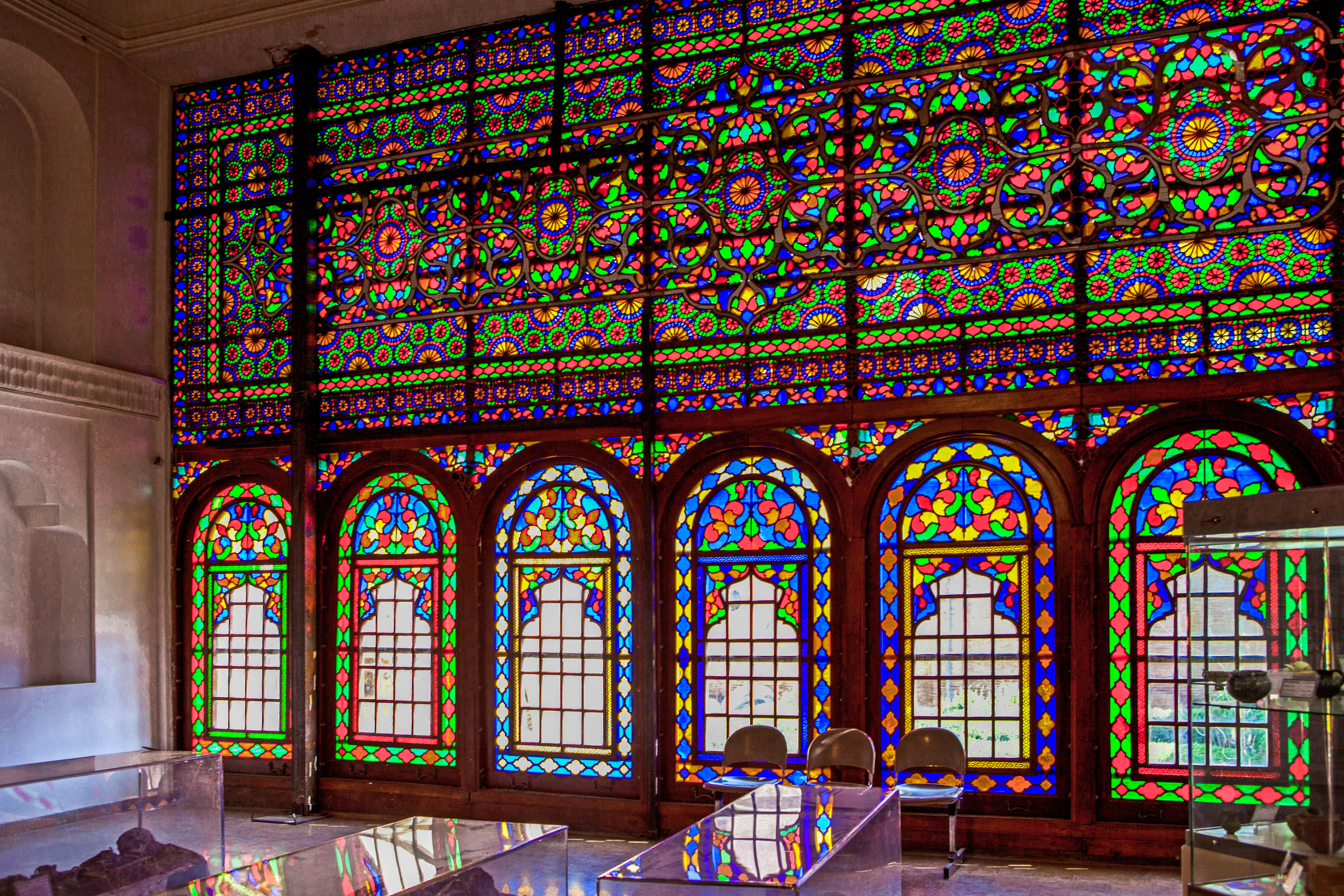
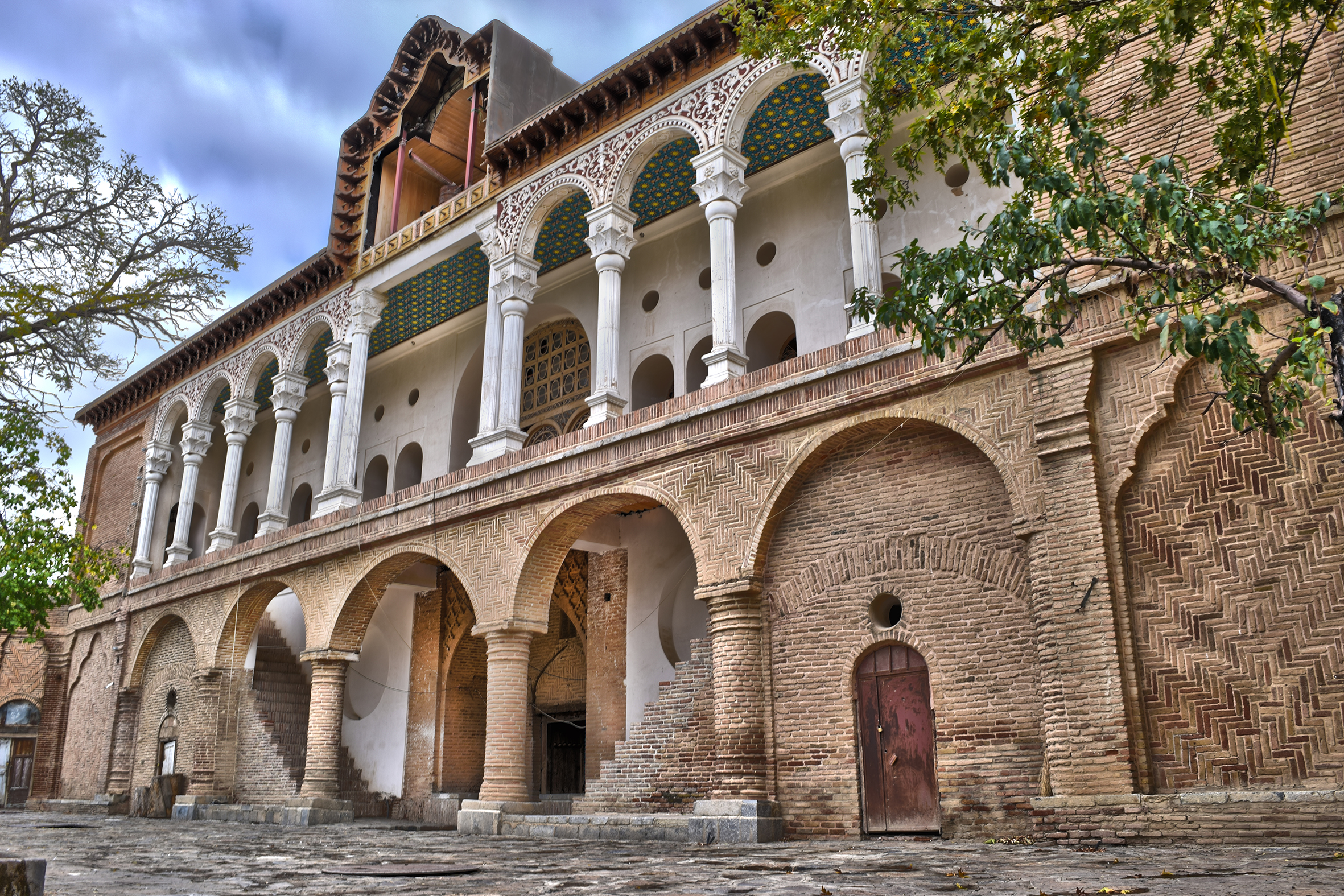
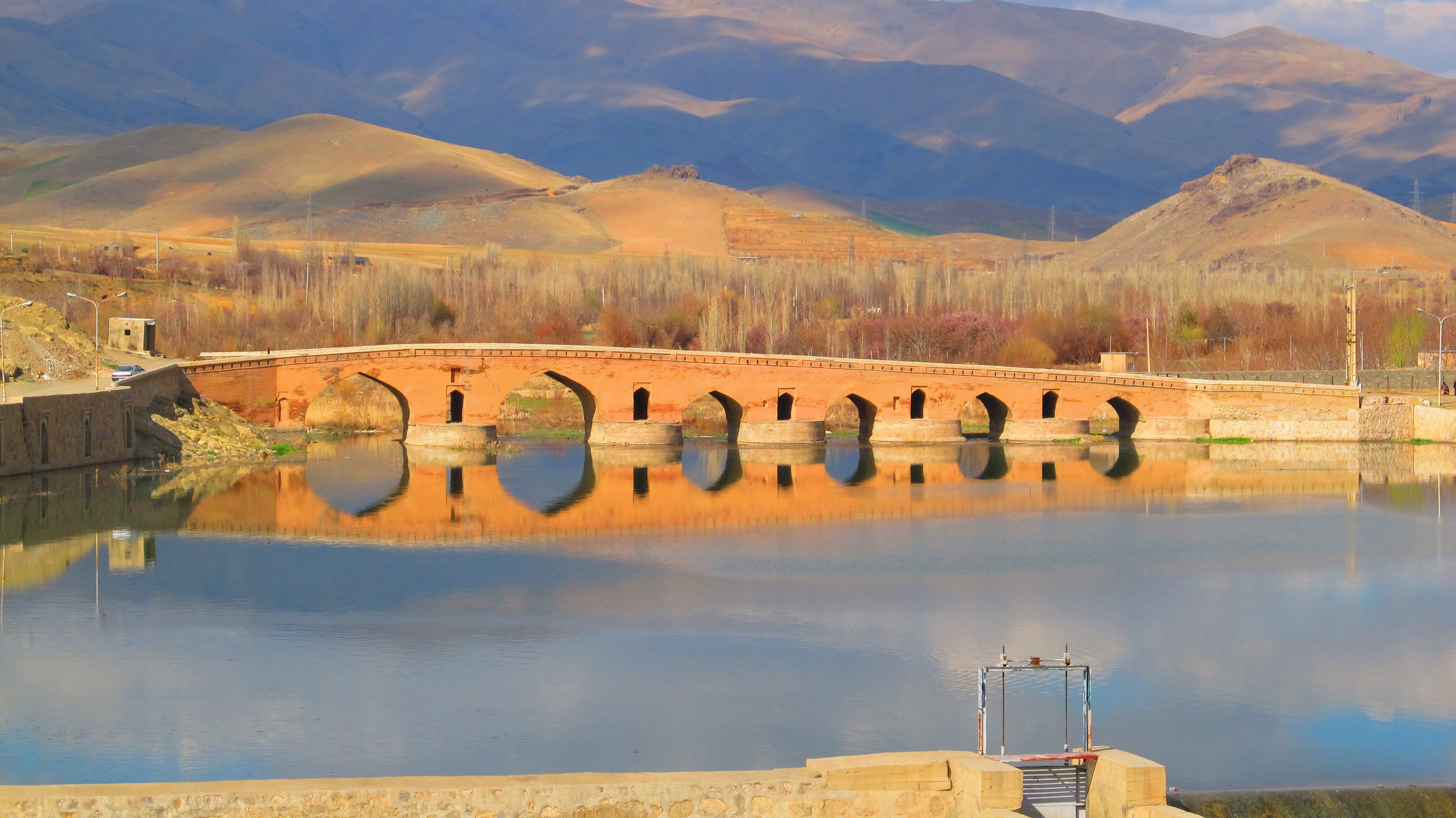
- Sanandaj from Abidar, Sanandaj Museum, Khosro Abad Mansion, Qeshlaq Bridge

- Seal
- Interactive map of Sanandaj
- Coordinates: 35°18′41″N 46°59′46″E
- Country: Iran
- Province: Kurdistan
- County: Sanandaj
- District: Central

Government
  - Mayor: Seyed Anwar Rashidi

Area
  - Total: 3,033 km^{2} (1,171 sq mi)
- Elevation: 1,538 m (5,046 ft)

Population (2016)
  - Total: 412,767
  - Density: 136.1/km^{2} (352.5/sq mi)
- Time zone: UTC+3:30 (IRST)
- Area code: 087
- Climate: Csa
- Website: e-sanandaj.ir

Sanandaj (Persian: سنندج; pronounced [sænænˈdædʒ] Kurdish: سنە, romanized: Senneh) is a city in the Central District of Sanandaj County, in the Kurdistan province of Iran, serving as capital of the province, the county, and the district. With a population of 850,000, it is the second largest Kurdish city and 20th largest city overall in Iran. The city is considered a historic centre of Kurdish cultural and intellectual life, particularly noted for its tradition of Kurdish music, poetry, and carpet weaving.

== History ==
Sanandaj's founding is fairly recent (about 250 years ago), yet in its short existence it has grown to become one of the centers of Kurdish culture. During the Iran–Iraq War the city was attacked by Iraqi planes and saw disturbances. Since 2019, UNESCO has recognized Sanandaj as Creative City of Music.

The name "Sinna" first appears in records from the 14th century CE. Before this, the main city in the region was Sisar, whose exact location is unknown. Sisar was also called "Sisar of Sadkhaniya", or "Sisar of the hundred springs", and it has been proposed that the current name of "Sinna" is a contracted form of "Sadkhaniya".

The name "Sisar" disappears in the 14th century and the name "Sinna" replaces it, for example in the works of Hamdallah Mustawfi who refers to a mountain and a pass with this name. Then the Kurdish historian Sharaf al-Din Bitlisi mentions that in 1580 an Ardalan ruler named Timur Khan had a land grant including Sinna and the earlier Ardalan capital of Hasanabad. However, the local historian Ali-Akbar Munshi Waqayi-Nigar wrote in 1892/3 that Sinna was founded later, by the ruler Soleyman Khan Ardalan, on the site of an earlier settlement; the chronogram he gives for this event corresponds to 1046 AH, or 1636-7 CE.

Sinna was developed significantly under the reign of Aman Allah "the Great" (from 1797-1825). 19th-century Sinna was "a lively commercial center, exporting oak galls, tragacanth, furs, and carpets". Its population was mostly Kurdish, with a significant Jewish minority and smaller numbers of Armenian and Assyrian Christians (the latter of which are predominantly Chaldean Catholic).

== Demographics ==
=== Ethnicity ===
The population of Sanandaj is mainly Kurdish. The city also had an Armenian minority who gradually emigrated from the city. Until the Iranian Revolution (1979), the city had a small Aramaic-speaking Jewish community of about 4,000 people. The city boasted a sizable Assyrian community that spoke a unique dialect of Aramaic called Senaya, they are mostly members of the Chaldean Catholic Church. The Kurdish character of Sanandaj has been extensively documented in urban studies scholarship. Alizadeh and colleagues (2019) characterise Sanandaj as a paradigmatic example of a traditional Kurdish city, noting that its urban morphology, architectural heritage, and social organisation have been shaped over centuries by Kurdish cultural norms.

=== Language ===
The linguistic composition of the city:

Sanandaj linguistic composition
Language	percent
Central Kurdish	86%
Hawrami	7%
New Persian	4.95%
Southern Kurdish	2%
Aramaic	0.05%

The predominance of Central Kurdish in the city reflects the broader demographic composition of Iranian Kurdistan. Persian serves primarily as the language of education, government, and inter-ethnic communication, while Kurdish is the dominant vernacular of daily life.

=== Religion ===
Most of the people of Sanandaj follow the Shafi‘i branch of Sunni Islam.

=== Population ===
At the time of the 2006 National Census, the city's population was 311,446 in 81,380 households. The following census in 2011 counted 373,987 people in 106,771 households. The 2016 census measured the population of the city as 412,767 people in 126,240 households.

The city is the second largest Kurdish city in Iran, behind Kermanshah.

== Geography ==
=== Location ===
The city is between the Qishlaq river, a tributary of the Diyala, and Mount Awidar, which separates it from the old Ardalan capital of Hasanabad. Carpet making is the biggest industry in Sanandaj.

=== Climate ===
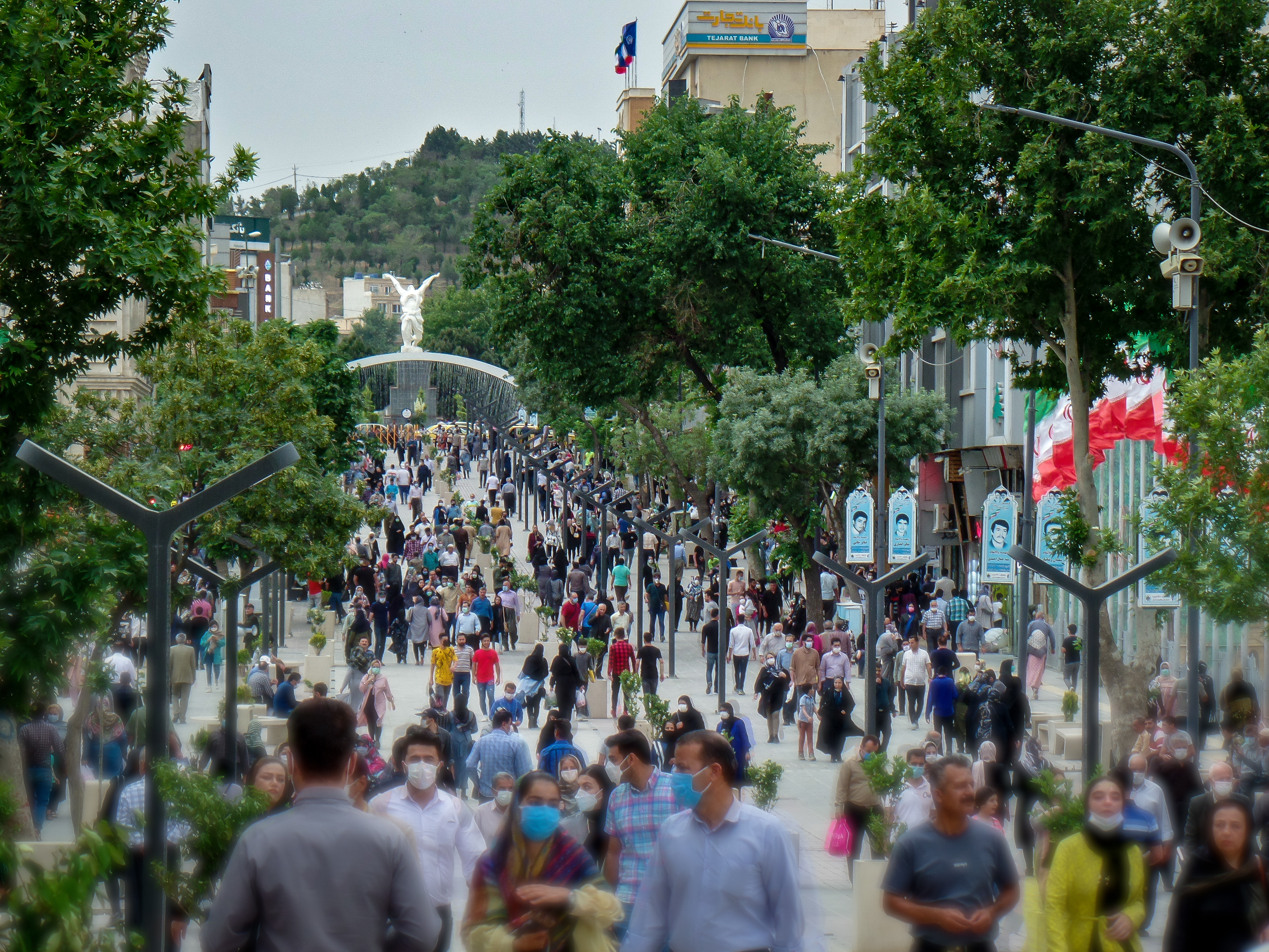
Sanandaj city center in 2021

Sanandaj has a Mediterranean climate (Csa) according to the Köppen climate classification, bordering on a humid continental climate (Dsa), with cold and wet winters and very hot and dry summers.

The synoptic station of Sanandaj started working in the autumn of 1959.

Highest recorded temperature: 44°C on 16 July 1981

Lowest recorded temperature: -31°C on 6 February 1974

Climate data for Sanandaj (1991-2020, extremes 1959-2020)
Month	Jan	Feb	Mar	Apr	May	Jun	Jul	Aug	Sep	Oct	Nov	Dec	Year
Record high °C (°F)	17.5 (63.5)	21.4 (70.5)	27.8 (82.0)	32.8 (91.0)	36.6 (97.9)	41.0 (105.8)	44.0 (111.2)	43.0 (109.4)	39.4 (102.9)	33.8 (92.8)	26.0 (78.8)	22.9 (73.2)	44.0 (111.2)
Mean daily maximum °C (°F)	7.0 (44.6)	9.7 (49.5)	15.0 (59.0)	20.5 (68.9)	26.4 (79.5)	33.7 (92.7)	37.7 (99.9)	37.5 (99.5)	32.5 (90.5)	24.9 (76.8)	15.3 (59.5)	9.7 (49.5)	22.5 (72.5)
Daily mean °C (°F)	0.8 (33.4)	3.0 (37.4)	7.8 (46.0)	12.8 (55.0)	17.8 (64.0)	24.3 (75.7)	28.4 (83.1)	27.6 (81.7)	21.9 (71.4)	15.4 (59.7)	7.8 (46.0)	3.1 (37.6)	14.2 (57.6)
Mean daily minimum °C (°F)	−4.4 (24.1)	−2.7 (27.1)	1.1 (34.0)	5.4 (41.7)	9.1 (48.4)	13.6 (56.5)	18.1 (64.6)	17.1 (62.8)	11.1 (52.0)	6.8 (44.2)	1.8 (35.2)	−2.1 (28.2)	6.2 (43.2)
Record low °C (°F)	−28.0 (−18.4)	−31.0 (−23.8)	−16.0 (3.2)	−7.0 (19.4)	−2.0 (28.4)	3.0 (37.4)	7.0 (44.6)	5.0 (41.0)	1.0 (33.8)	−4.6 (23.7)	−14.0 (6.8)	−23.6 (−10.5)	−31.0 (−23.8)
Average precipitation mm (inches)	44.6 (1.76)	50.7 (2.00)	58.0 (2.28)	65.9 (2.59)	28.9 (1.14)	2.2 (0.09)	1.3 (0.05)	0.2 (0.01)	1.0 (0.04)	28.2 (1.11)	55.8 (2.20)	47.4 (1.87)	384.2 (15.14)
Average precipitation days (≥ 1.0 mm)	6.8	7.1	7.9	7.6	4.3	0.6	0.3	0.1	0.5	3	6.4	5.9	50.5
Average rainy days	6.9	8.8	11.4	11.4	5.9	0.9	0.5	0.3	0.4	4.9	10.4	8.3	70.1
Average snowy days	8.0	6.4	2.1	0.3	0.0	0.0	0.0	0.0	0.0	0.0	0.6	3.9	21.3
Average relative humidity (%)	70	64	55	53	46	28	24	24	29	43	63	69	47
Average dew point °C (°F)	−4.7 (23.5)	−3.9 (25.0)	−2.3 (27.9)	1.6 (34.9)	3.7 (38.7)	2.2 (36.0)	3.7 (38.7)	3.0 (37.4)	0.8 (33.4)	0.9 (33.6)	0.1 (32.2)	−2.9 (26.8)	0.2 (32.3)
Mean monthly sunshine hours	155	166	211	231	295	356	357	347	313	255	183	152	3,021
Source 1: NCEI
Source 2: IRIMO (extremes, snow/sleet days for 1959-2010)

== Economy ==
The economy of Sanandaj is based upon the production of carpets, processed hides and skins, milled rice, refined sugar, woodworking, cotton weaving, metalware and cutlery.

In Sanandaj, there is a combined cycle power plant with a capacity of 1000 megawatts, a petrochemical plant, a tractor manufacturing plant, a tire manufacturing plant, a tile and ceramic manufacturing plant, a pasteurized milk manufacturing plant, and hundreds of other factories.

There is also an international airport in Sanandaj.

In Sanandaj, there are two 5-star hotels, Laleh Hotel and Jin Plus Hotel, two 4-star hotels, Shadi Hotel and Shahu Hotel, and two 3-star hotels, Jahangardi Hotel and Farhangian Hotel.

The world's largest open-air cinema is located in Abidar Forest Park.

== Notable people ==
See: Category:People from Sanandaj

- Mastoureh Ardalan, Kurdish poet and historian
- Jalal Malaksha, Kurdish poet
- Mazhar Khaleqi, Kurdish singer
- Abbas Kamandi, Kurdish singer
- Nasser Razazi, Kurdish singer
- Voria Ghafouri, Kurdish footballer
- Zhina Modares Gorji is a local bookseller and podcaster who was sentenced to over 20 years in Sanandaj prison on several charges. The sentence was reduced on appeal to 2 years and 4 months for "propaganda against the state" in 2024.

== See also ==
Media related to Sanandaj at Wikimedia Commons

== Sources ==
- Yamaguchi, Akihiko (2021). "The Kurdish frontier under the Safavids". In Matthee, Rudi (ed.). The Safavid World. Routledge. pp. 556–571.
