= Dilan Ensemble =

Kurdish-Iranian music ensemble

- Origin: Kurdistan, Iran
- Genres: World, Kurdish, Middle East
- Years active: 2003–present
- Label: RAVI AZAR KIMIA CO
- Members: Shahriyar Jamshidi
- Past members: Afsoon Sadeghzadeh; Alex Lubet; Alireza Javaheri; Amin Ramin; Farbod Yadollahi; Fariborz Raoufi; Hafez Alikhani; Kaveh Baban; Leila Golbangi; Saber Nazargahil; Sahar Ebrahim; Sara Ahmadi; Saeid Vojdanpak; Sina Khosravi; Toktam Moslehi; Raphael Weinroth-Brwone; Richard Robeson; Masoud Abazari; Masoud Khezri; Mohsen Badri; Mohammad Khaledian; Yadollah Rahmani
- Website: dilanmusic.org

Dilan Ensemble is a Kurdish Music Ensemble from Iranian Kurdistan or Eastern Kurdistan (Kurdish: Rojhilatê Kurdistanê, ڕۆژھەڵاتی کوردستان), which was established by the Kamanche player and composer Shahriyar Jamshidi in memoriam of Kurdish musician brothers Qadir Dilan and Muhamad Salih Dilan from Southern Kurdistan (Kurdish: باشووری کوردستان, romanized: Başûrê Kurdistanê) in 2003.

== Backgrounds ==
Dilan Chamber Music ensemble's focus are to preserve the original Kurdish classical music and represent lyrical songs. The Kurdish folk songs and Maqam music from East part of Kurdistan were the major resources of their works at the beginning. The ensemble has accompanied a male singer and three choirs’ females on stage. Since 2007, duo to restriction of speech, tighten political situation and unpleasant circumstances in general for art workers in particular for Kurdish people in Iran, Dilan Ensemble have not been allowed to reassemble on stage again.

== Performances ==
Dilan Ensemble with their full orchestra have performed several concerts in Tehran including Roudaki Hall and Arasbaran Cultural Centre (2004). They appeared as a trio on stage and have presented songs from different regions of Kurdistan in a distinctive dialect Kurmanji from North East of Iran, Khorasan at Mahak Hospital and Rehabilitation Complex (2007). In the upcoming years, Shahriyar jamshidi keeps Dilan Ensemble alive and active by collaborating with diverse musical artists by arranging multiple projects in Canada, US and Europe; Dilan Ensemble have performed at Festival du Monde Arabe de Montréal, Tirgan Festival, Mackenzie House, McMaster University and Small Word Music Centre in Ontario, Canada.

== Discography ==
- Alvanati (2004)
- Call of the Mountains (2008)
- A Yellow Flower (2014), it was contributed to the people of Kobanî.

== Former members ==
Collaboration year	Artist name	Instrument	Concert-Album
2003–2004	Afsoon Sadeghzadeh	Singer	Arasbaran Cultural Centre and Rudaki Hall concerts
2016–2018	Alex Lubet	Guitar, Mountain Dulcimer	Concerts in Waterloo, Toronto and Minneapolis; Recording the Kamanche and Dulcimer album
1997–present	Alireza Javaheri fa:علیرضا جواهری	Santour, record producer	Performer in Alvanati album and Music producer in A Yellow Flower album
2005–2007	Amin Ramin	tar	
2006–2015	Farbod Yadollahi fa:فربد یداللهی	Percussions	Concerts in Tehran; High-Fest, Armenia, 2015; A Yellow Flower album
2000–2004	Fariborz Raoufi	Singer	Rudaki Hall concert
2003–2004	Hafez Alikhani	Singer	Arasbaran Cultural Centre concert
1997–2007	Kaveh Baban	Singer	Concerts in Iranian cities; A Yellow Flower
2000–2004	Leila Golbangi	Singer	Concerts at Shafagh and Arasbaran Cultural Centers and Rudaki Hall
2000–2007	Saber Nazargahil	Tar, Bağlama	Concerts in Iranian cities; Alvanati album
2005–2007	Sahar Ebrahim	Qanun	
2004	Saeid Vojdanpak	Daf	Concerts at Rudaki Hall
2000–2007	Sara Ahmadi	Daf	Concerts in Tehran
2013–2017	Sina Khosravi	Percussions	Canadian concerts
2000–2004	Toktam Moslehi	Singer	Concerts at Shafagh & Arasbaran Cultural Centres and Rudaki Hall
2014–present	Raphael Weinroth-Browne	Cello	Small Word music Centre concert
2013–2016	Richard Robeson	Guitar	Small World Music Centre concert; and Meet Me in Tangier album
2001–2007	Masoud Abazari	Santur	Concerts in Tehran
2006–2007	Masoud Khezri	Dutar	Kherad and Mahak Hall concerts, Tehran
2003–2007	Mohsen Badri	Percussions	Concerts; Alvanati & Call of the Mountains albums
2000–2004	Mohammad Khaledian	Oud	Concerts in Tehran
2001–2003	Yadollah Rahmani fa:یدالله رحمانی	Singer, poet	Kurdsat TV shows; Alvanati album
