= Solmaz Daryani =

Iranian photojournalist and documentary photographer

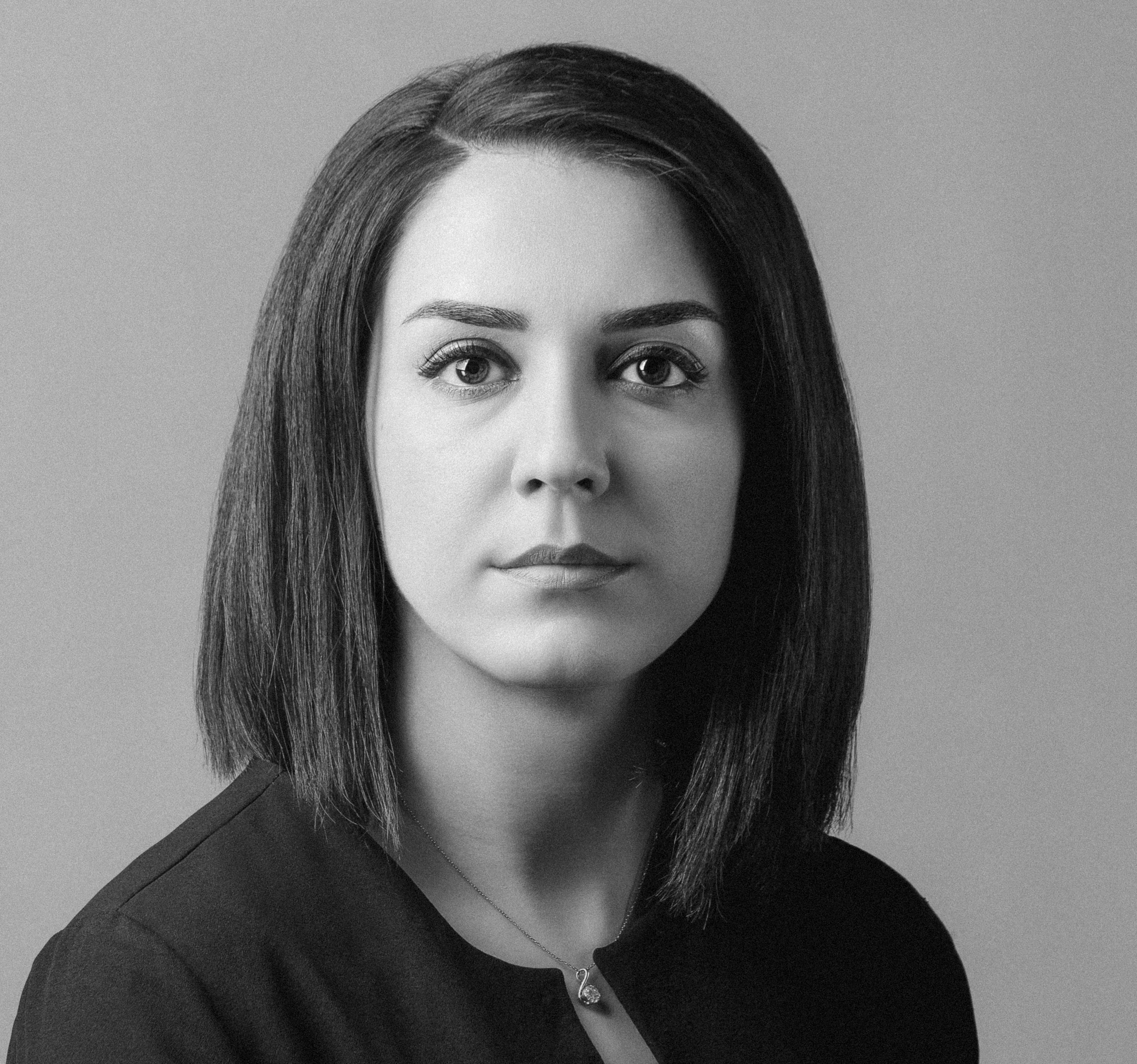

Solmaz Daryani (Persian: سولماز داریانی) (born 1989 in Tabriz, Iran) is an Iranian Azeri photographer and visual artist based in the UK and Iran. Her work is particularly known for exploring the themes of climate security, climate change, water crisis, the human identity and environment in the Middle East. Daryani is a member of Women Photograph and Diversify Photo.

== Life and career ==
Daryani studied computer science at Azad University, emerging from school with a B.A. in software engineering. She started approaching photography as a self-taught photographer in 2012. Since 2014 Solmaz Daryani covered the environmental and human impact of the drying of Lake Urmia, one of the most unfortunate environmental disasters in the Middle East, which was published in her first book The Eyes of Earth by FotoEvidence Foundation in 2021.

In fall 2019, she received The Alexandra Boulat Grant in remembrance of the late, prize winning French photographer, who was a member and co-founder of VII Photo Agency, to study at DMJX. In 2017, she received the Magnum Foundation Grant for a call themed “On Religion”. Her ongoing project, The Eyes of Earth, is the recipient of the IdeasTap and Magnum Photos, PhotogrVphy Grant and the FotoEvidence Book Award.

She is a member of Women Photograph and DiversifyPhoto. Through her work, she explores the link between people and their environment through personal narratives by identifying locations, characters and scenes. Solmaz Daryani usually works on long-term projects. Since the beginning of her career, she has worked on storytelling by creating series over more extended periods to understand how time impacts the people and environment. Her long-term photo projects include The Eyes of Earth (2014–ongoing) and In Deserts of Wetland (2018-ongoing). In 2017, she featured in a French documentary film "Focus Iran" about five Iranian photographers testify to the vitality of a creation confronted with the rules.

Daryani has worked internationally, covering water crisis, climate change, and social documentary stories in Iran, Afghanistan, Turkey and the United Kingdom. Her work has been published by international magazines and newspapers such as The New York Times, Der Spiegel, National Geographic Magazine, Atlas Obscura, Foreign Policy Magazine, L'OBS Magazine Le Monde hors serie, Polka Magazine, The American Scholar Magazine and other publications.

== Photographs ==
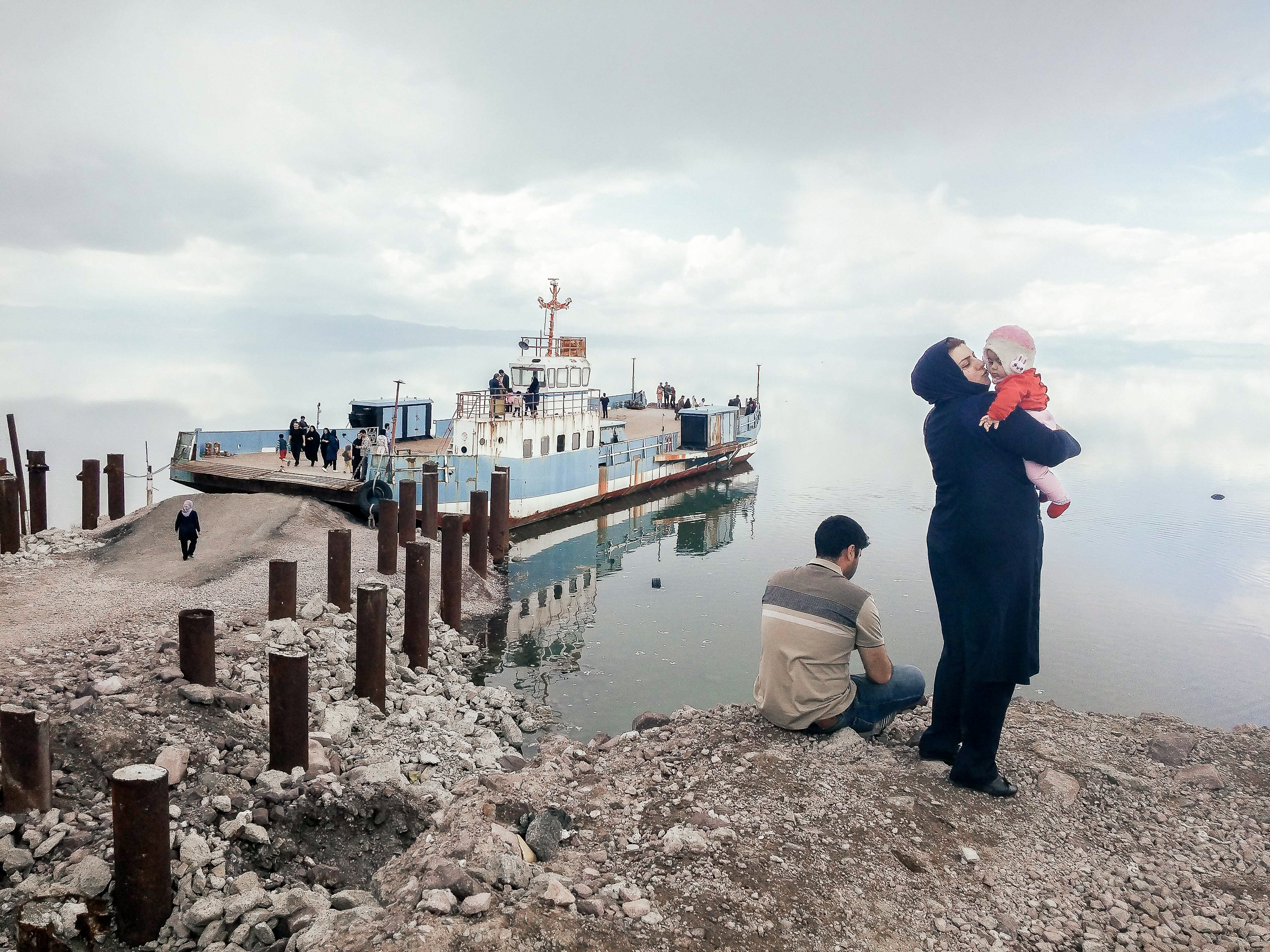

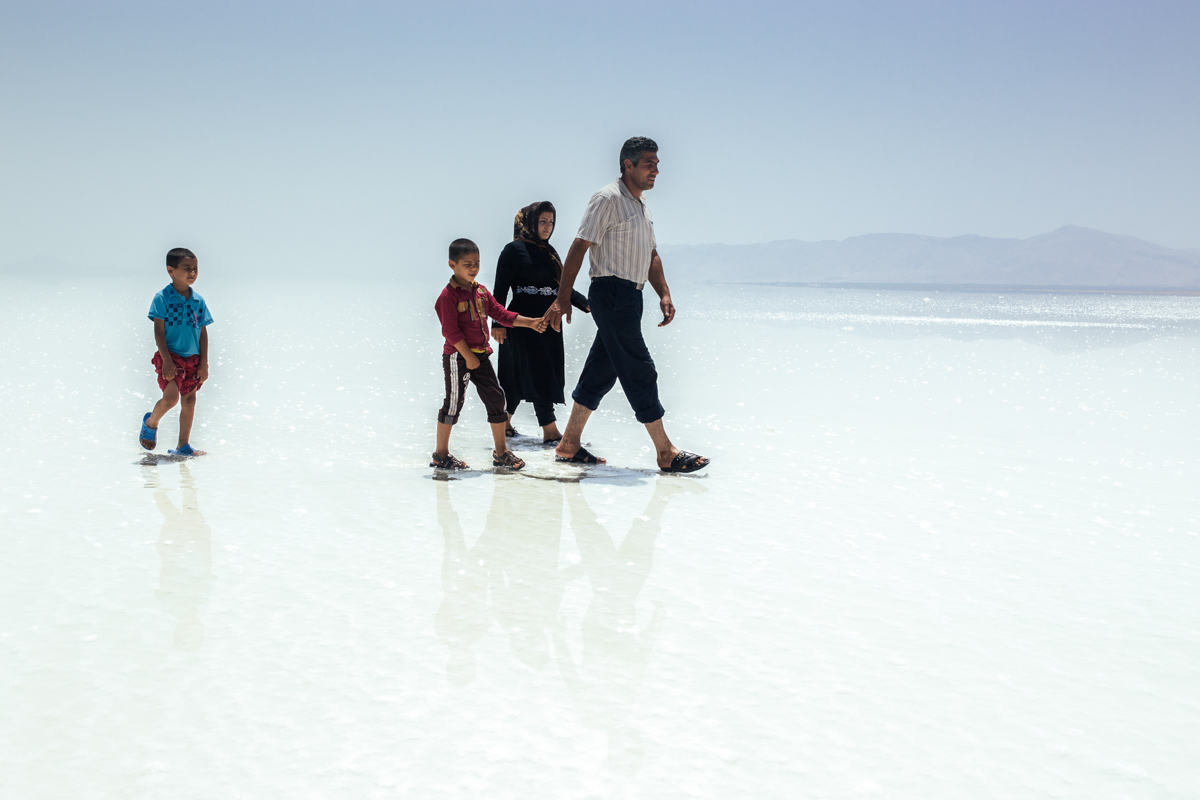

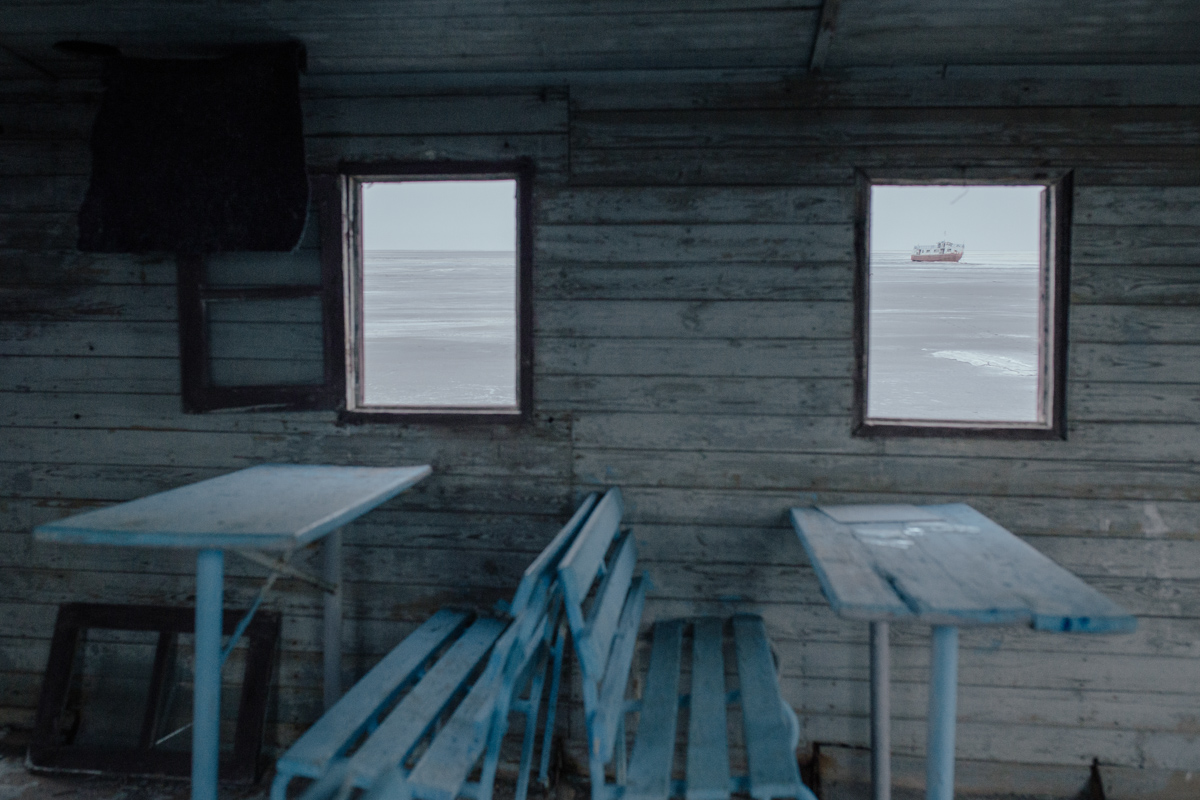

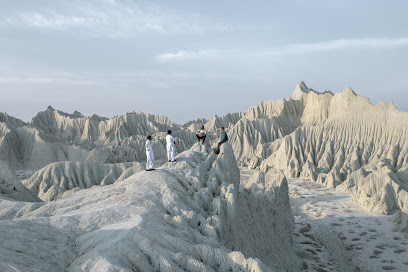

== Awards and exhibitions ==
- 2021 The winner of the 2021 FotoEvidence Book Award
- 2021 RPS Science Photographer of the Year finalist
- 2020 Award of Excellence in 75th College Photographer of the Year in the category of Portrait
- 2020 Runner up for Marilyn Stafford Fotoreportage Award
- 2019 Recipient of Alexandra Boulat Grant by the VII Foundation and VII Academy
- 2019 Finalist in The IWPA Award by the International Women Photographers Association, France
- 2018 Second Place, 2018 PhotogrVphy Grant in the category of Climate
- 2018 Shortlisted for The IWPA Award by the International Women Photographers Association 2018, France
- 2017 Recipient of Magnum Foundation “On Religion” collaborative photography Grant, NYC, USA
- 2016 Recipient of IdeasTap with Magnum Photos Grant, London, United Kingdom
- 2016 Shortlisted for D&AD Next Photographer Award, London, United Kingdom
- 2015 Shortlisted for Sheed Grant (Independent Award for Documentary Photography)
- 2013 Tirgan Contemporary Art Prize Award, Toronto, Canada
- 2013 Shortlisted for Borsa International Photography Festival, Borsa, Turkey
- 2020 After Us, The Flood in KUNST HAUS WIEN ecological museum, Wien (AUT)
- 2020 Brooklyn, NYC, Photoville’s Artists to Watch (US)
- 2020 PhEST International festival of photography and art, Monopoli (ITL)
- 2020 My Environment International Festival, Neue Schule für Fotografie, Berlin (DE)
- 2019 F2 Fotofestival on Water and justice, Dortmund, Germany
- 2019 United Nations Development Programme’s exhibition on inequality and climate change at Photoville in Brooklyn, NYC, United States
- 2019 Group show, IRAN, 1979-2019 Maupetit Cŏtė Gallery, Marseille
- 2019 IWPA travelling exhibition, La Galerie, Dubai, Alliance Française
- 2018 “(IR) Real Iran”, Gallery Mandarin, Paris, France. In partnership with Sciences Po Paris and the NGO La Chaîne
- 2017 “Iran Anne 38” Group show, Les Rencontres d’Arles; Curated by Anahita Ghabaian Etehadieh and Newsha Tavakolian; Festival, Église Sainte-Anne, Arles (FR)
- 2016 PondyPHOTO India International Art Festival (India)
- 2013 Bursa Photo Festival, Colors of life exhibition, Bursa, Turkey
- 2013 Tirgan Iranian/Canadian art and culture Festival and Visual art exhibition (CA)
- 2012 HIPA Photo Contest annual Book exhibition in Wollongong University of Dubai (UAE)
