= Kamancello =

- Origin: Canada; Iran
- Genres: World; Instrumental; Improvisation; Classical; Kurdish
- Instruments: Kamanche; Cello
- Years active: 2014-present
- Members: Shahriyar Jamshidi; Raphael Weinroth-Browne

Kamancello is a Canadian Kamanche/Cello duo, composed of Raphael Weinroth-Browne (cello) and Shahriyar Jamshidi (Kamanche). It is an instrumental World musical group.

== History ==
The Kamancello named when the duo was invited to perform at Festival du Monde Arabe de Montréal in 2015, the Festival chose “Kamancello” for the title. Their name is the combination of two musical instruments Kamanche and Cello. Kamancello is an improvisational cultural boundaries, their performances are typically based in improvisation on Kurdish modal music and Western Classical music on Kamanche (four-stringed-spiked-fiddle) and Cello. The band recorded their first self-titled studio album and Kamancello II: Voyage at Toronto's recording Studio Union Sound Company in 2016.

== Performances ==
- Ottawa Chamberfest, August 2024.
- Winnipeg New Music Festival, Winnipeg Symphony Orchestra January 2024.
- Windsor Symphony Orchestra 2019.
- Canadian Opera Company 2019.
- Cello Biennale 2018.
- Festival du Monde Arabe de Montréal 2015.

== Discography ==
- Of Shadows released digitally in 2020.
- Kamancello II: Voyage in 2019.
- Kamancello (album), the self-titled debut improvisation album in 2017.
