= Viyan Peyman =

Kurdish singer and YPJ fighter (died 2015)

- Born: Gülistan Tali Cinganlo; 1988; Kobani, Syria
- Died: 6 April 2015 (aged 26–27); Sere Kaniye, Syria
- Cause of death: KIA
- Resting place: Şehit Rüstem Cudi Martyrs' Cemetery, Dirbêsiyê
- Occupations: Singer/songwriter, Kurdish resistance fighter
- Known for: Fighting IS, traditional Kurdish folk songs

Viyan Peyman (originally Gülistan Tali Cinganlo) was an Iranian Kurdish singer and fighter with the Women's Protection Units (YPJ) who was killed fighting the Islamic State (IS) in Syria in 2015.

Cinganlo was from the town of Kobani, in Syrian Kurdistan. Before the Syrian Civil War, she was a teacher. Cinganlo was a folk singer, and wrote her own music in traditional Kurdish folk style. She was known as a dengbêj, a folk singer or storyteller, for her songs about the Kurdish resistance to the Islamic State in the Rojava-Islamist conflict, and her fellow fighters who had died.

Cinganlo was injured twice, shot in her leg and stomach, but returned to continue fighting. She told NBC News that she was fighting in the Siege of Kobane for the women of the Middle East: "We stand and fight, especially here in the Middle East where women are treated as inferiors. We stand here as symbols of strength for all the women of the region."

Cinganlo was killed while fighting the Islamic State on 6 April 2015. The battle for Kobane ended in January 2015, and Cinganlo was killed in the town of Sere Kaniye on the Syria-Turkey border, where she had gone in mid-February. She was buried in the Şehit Rüstem Cudi Martyrs' Cemetery in Dirbêsiyê. Many artists around the world highlighted Cinganlo's life in their works after her death.

The Kurdish musician Shahriyar Jamshidi has devoted his composition "Viyan" from his 2020 released My Sunset-Land ROJAVA album to Cinganlo, celebrating her life as a Kurdish singer from Iran where there are legal restrictions on women's public singing.
