= Shahriyar Jamshidi =

Kurdish Iranian Kamancheh player and composer

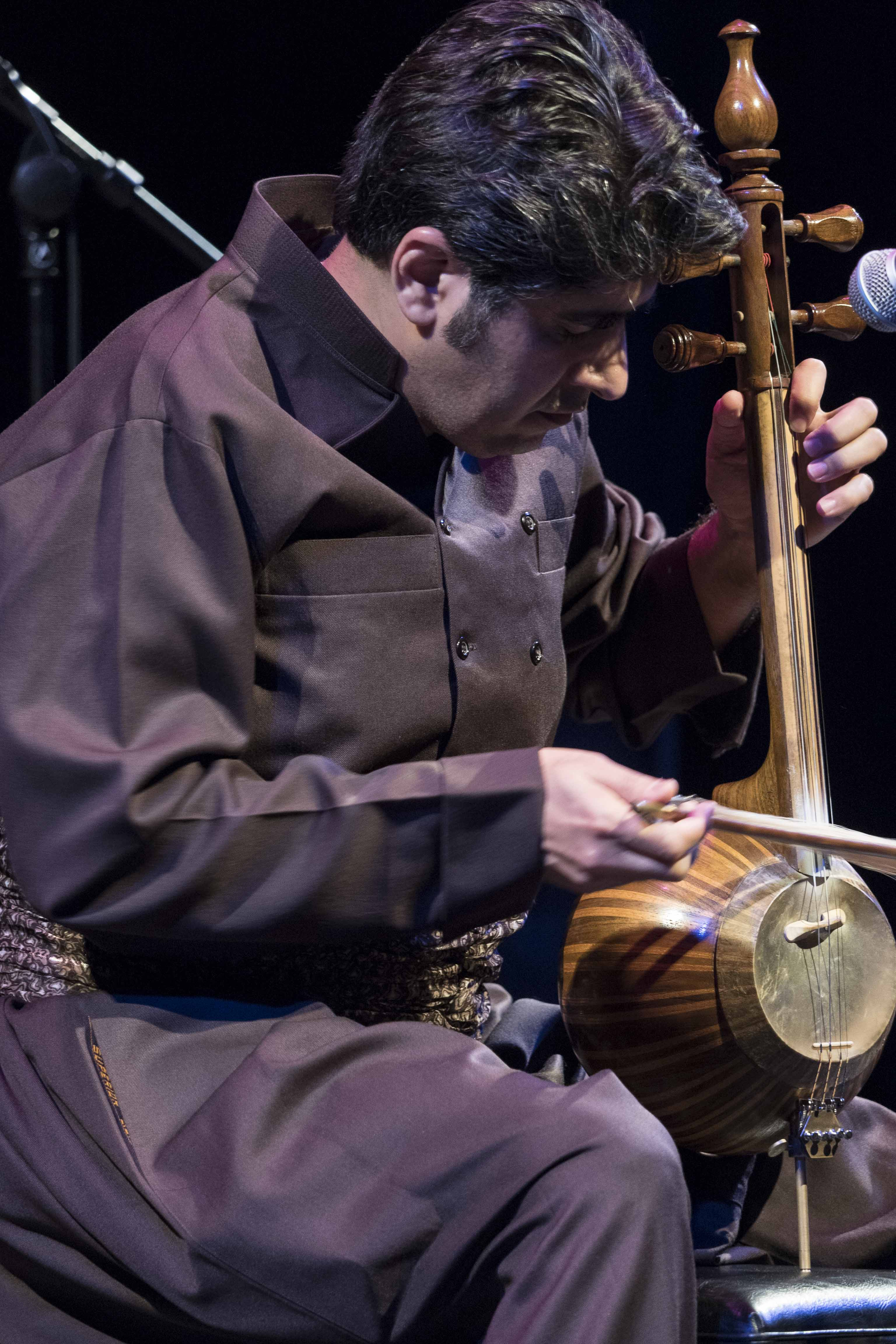
- Shahriyar Jamshidi at Ontario Contact 2016

Background information
- Born: 1971 (age 54–55); Kermanshah, Iran
- Genres: Kurdish music; West Asian Music
- Occupations: Kamancheh player; composer
- Instrument: Kamancheh
- Years active: 1990–present
- Website: shahriyarjamshidi.com

Shahriyar Jamshidi (Kurdish: Şehrîyar Cemşîdî, Persian: شهریار جمشیدی, Sorani Kurdish: شەهریار جەمشیدی) (born 1971) is a Kurdish-Canadian kamānche player and composer. His focus is mainly on Kurdish music.

== Life and education ==
Shahriyar was born in a Kurdish family in Kermanshah, the Kurdish city in the west of Iran. Due to limitations following the Iranian Revolution in 1978, he was not able to study music until age 17. He received private music lessons under the supervision of Mahmoud Merati for two years before studying music at Tehran University of Art. He continued his music studies under various teachers including Ahmad Pejman, Houshang Kamkar, Ardeshir Kamkar and Taghi Binesh. He also worked under the directorship of the well known Kurdish Kamancheh player Mojtaba Mirzadeh.

== Works ==
- As a Kamanche soloist, Jamshidi has been participating at International Security for Improvised Music Conference in Château-d'Œx, Switzerland; Wilfrid Laurier University in Canada; Ontario Contact Conference; 33rd World Conference of International Society for Music Education in Baku, Azerbaijan in July 2018; University of Glasgow in 2023, and the biennial Canadian Sound Symposium (XXI) in St John's, Newfoundland in 2024.
- He established Dilan Ensemble in the memory of the Kurdish composer Kurdish: Qadir Dîlan in 2003; had performances in several Iranian cities including Roudaki Hall Tehran; Tirgan Festival; High-Fest Festival in Yerevan, Armenia in 2015; and McMaster University in 2018.
- Jamshidi also as a co-founder and performer of the Canadian Kamanche / Cello Duo Kamancello, has performed at Festival du Monde Arabe de Montréal in 2015; Cello Biënnale Amsterdam in 2018; collaborated with Maestro Robert Franz in 2019 and Windsor Symphony Orchestra playing "Convergence Suite for Kamancello"; and performed with Winnipeg Symphony Orchestra in 2024.
- He had musical collaboration with Richard Robeson in recording his album Meet me in Tangier in 2016; and with a music professor Alex Lubet in University of Minnesota School of Music in 2018.
- Jamshidi has been working individually and with different groups including Chakad Ensemble under the direction of Alireza Javaheri to collaborate with Bahman Rajabi at Farabi Amphitheater in 2000.

== Award and residency ==
- Ontario Arts Council, Music Recording Projects to create "My Sunset-Land ROJAVA" (2020).
- Toronto Arts Council, Music Creation and Audio Recording (2019).
- University of Minnesota, School of Music, residency in September (2018).
- World Conference Sponsor Delegate Award, International Society for Music Education (2018).
- Arts Abroad, Canada Council (2018); and (2024).
- Banff Musicians in Residence program at Banff Centre in winter (2017), and (2025).

== Discography ==
His most renowned works are:

- My Sunset-Land ROJAVA (2020).
- Of Shadows (2020).
- HiRUDin, Austra (band), (2020).
- Kamancello II: Voyage (2019).
- Kamancello (2017), is a duo, instrumental, improvisation music and first album of kamancello duo. The scope of Kamancello's creation ranges from soulful and emotive to incendiary and intense, and its sound has been described as being "totally entrancing.
- The Lullaby of a Nomad (2018), the Kamanche Solo album is representing sounds of Kurds from Kurdish modes in improvisation.
- Meet Me in Tangier by Richard Robeson (2016).
- A Yellow Flower (2014), this album is arranged for the Kamanche ensemble and vocals. It is the selection of Kurdish poet Abdulla Pashew's works. A Yellow Flower has dedicated to the people of Kobani.
- Call of the Mountains (2008).
- Alvanati (2004), it is the Kurdish folk project. This cassette is the selected songs of the late Kurdish Bard singer "Yadollah Rahmani" performed and recorded with Kurdish-Iranian traditional orchestra.
