= My Sunset-Land ROJAVA =

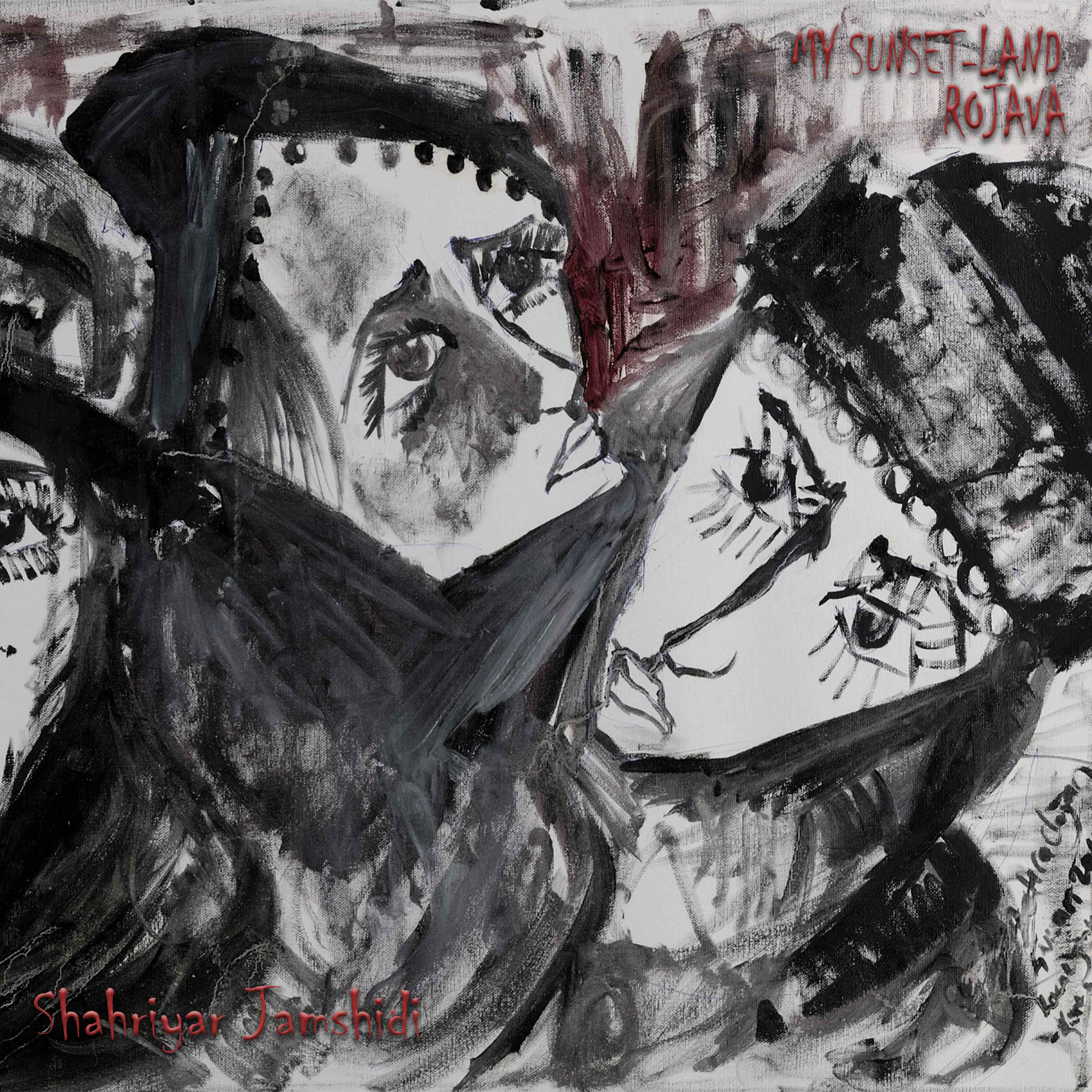

Studio album by Shahriyar Jamshidi
- Released: 19 June 2020, Canada
- Recorded: February 2020, Toronto, Canada
- Studio: Revolution Recording
- Genre: Instrumental Kurdish
- Length: 46:43

Shahriyar Jamshidi chronology
The Lullaby of A Nomad (2018)	My Sunset-Land ROJAVA (2020)

My Sunset-Land ROJAVA is the fifth solo album of the Kurdish Kamancheh player Shahriyar Jamshidi. This self-published project released in hard-copy and digital formats.

My Sunset-Land ROJAVA is a full-length instrumental album for Kamancheh consists of nine tracks - two composed music and seven improvisation music, based on micro-tonal West Asian from Kurdish region.

My Sunset-Land ROJAVA highlights the roles of women in revolutionary resistances in the western Kurdistan Rojava in recent years; the album is dedicated to women of Kurdistan who lost their life to free Rojava. The song Viyan is in memory of the Kurdish singer Viyan Peyman and track nine Tears Of Shingal commemorates the Sinjar massacre where hundreds of innocent people were sacrificed by ISIL.

== Track listing ==
No.	Title	Length
1.	"Viyan"	7:23
2.	"Midnightish"	4:45
3.	"Pomegranate Seeds"	5:49
4.	"Rojhelat"	2:59
5.	"Amordād"	4:44
6.	"Şoke (Barro, Brant's oak syrup)"	5:09
7.	"Pendar (Figment)"	6:50
8.	"Dersim"	5:26
9.	"Tears of Şingal (Sinjar)"	5:38
Total length:		46:43

== Personal ==
- Shahriyar Jamshidi - Composition and Kamancheh
- L. Stuart Young - Recording & Mixing
- Fedge - Mastering
- Zehra Doğan – Artwork
- Jef Rabillon - Photographer
- Roxana Khoshravesh – Layout
- HÎra Çavken & Mitchell Fillion - Video
