= Qadir Dilan =

Kurdish singer (1930–1999)

Qadir Dilan قادر دیلان
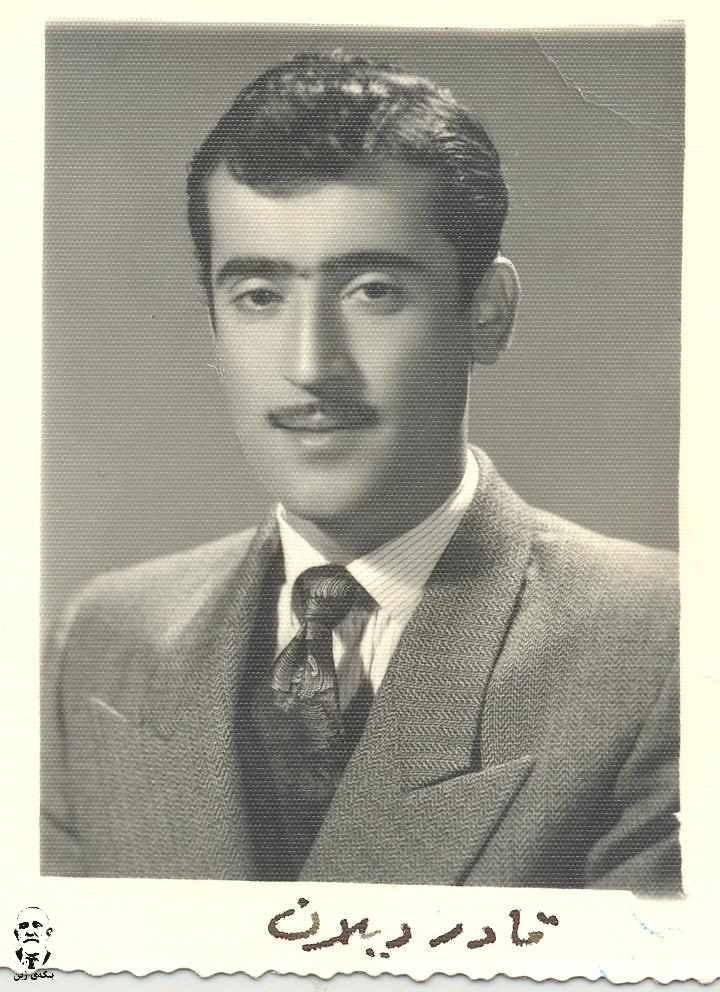

Background information
- Born: 24 March 1930; Sulaymaniyah, Iraqi Kurdistan
- Origin: Kurdish
- Died: 18 March 1999 (aged 68) Prague, Czech Republic
- Genres: Kurdish folk, western, classic
- Occupations: Singer, songwriter and musician
- Instruments: Violin, flute
- Years active: 1950s–1999
- Spouse: Auna (in 1965)

Qadir Dilan (Kurdish: قادر دیلان, romanized: Qadir Dîlan; 24 March 1930 – 18 March 1999) was a celebrated Kurdish singer, songwriter and musician known for his contributions to Kurdish music. Born in Sulaymaniyah Kurdistan Region, he began his musical journey at a young age, performing traditional Kurdish songs. He is considered to be the first Kurdish singer to mix Western styles with Kurdish music. Qadir Dilan was the brother of Muhamad Salih Dilan.

== Background ==
Qadir is the son of Mullah Ahmed Dilan, son of Mullah Qadir Shawkhwen, (Note: Kurdish: شەوخوێن, romanized: Şewxiwên) was born on 24 March 1930 in Goyzha neighborhood of Sulaymaniyah, Kurdistan Region. His father was a prominent religious man. In the autumn of 1964, he fell in love with a Czech girl named Auna. In 1965, he married her and they had a son named Aram and a daughter named Barbara.

== Death ==
In 1998, he was diagnosed with stomach cancer and underwent unsuccessful surgery in Prague in the Czech Republic. He died on 18 March 1999. On 22 March 1999, buried in the Olšany Cemetery in Prague. On 22 September 2011, his body was returned to Sulaymaniyah on the orders of Hero Ibrahim Ahmed.

== See also ==
- Dilan Ensemble
