= Yalda Night =

Persian festival

Yalda/Chilla Night
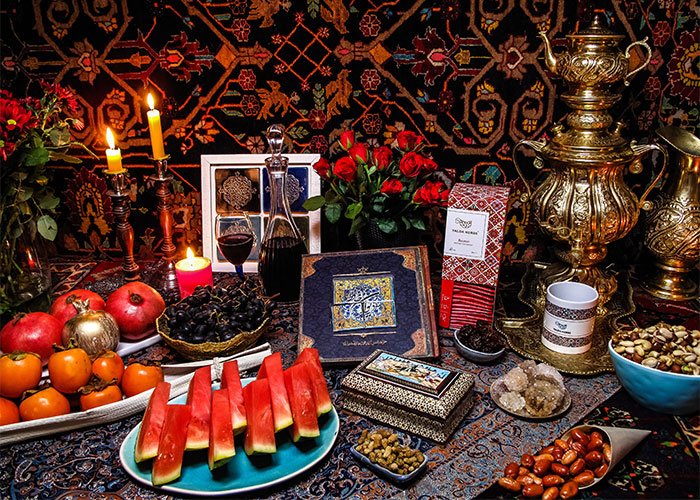
- Table of Chilla Night
- Observed by: Iran (Kurdistan Region) Kurdistan; Tajikistan; Afghanistan; Azerbaijan; Turkmenistan; Uzbekistan
- Significance: Longest night of the year in the Northern Hemisphere
- Date: December 21 (20 in leap year)
- Duration: 1 night
- Frequency: Annual
- Related to: Yule, Nowruz, Tirgan, Chaharshanbe Suri

Yaldā/Chilla
- UNESCO Intangible Cultural Heritage
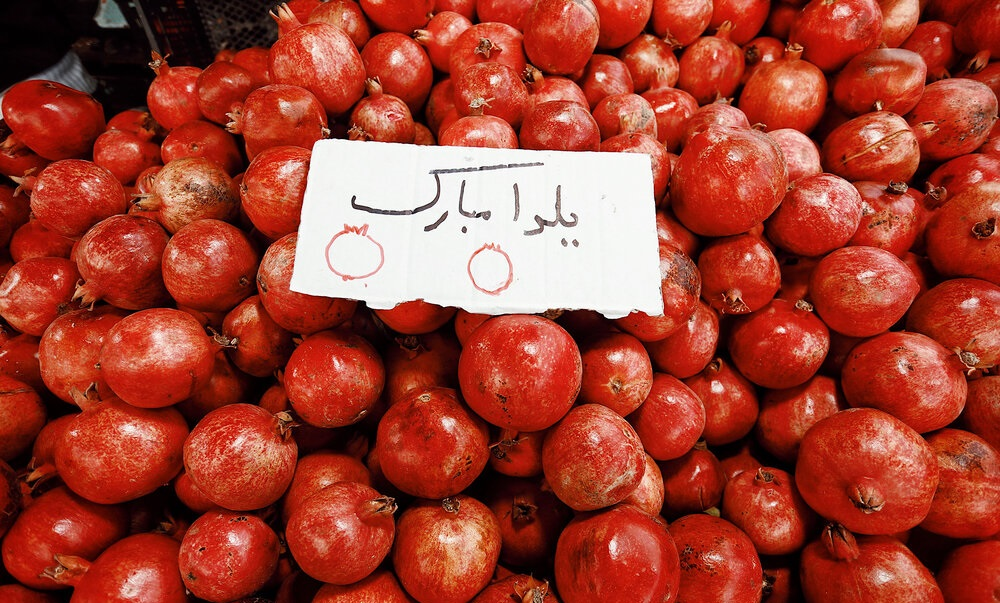
- Country: Iran; Afghanistan
- Reference: 01877
- Region: Asia and the Pacific

Inscription history
- Inscription: 2022 (17th session)
- List: Representative

Yaldā Night (Persian: شب یلدا, romanized: šab-i yaldā, pronounced [ʃa.bi jal.ˈdaː]) or Chilla Night (also Chelle Night, Persian: شب چلّه, romanized: šab-i čilla, lit. 'fortieth night', pronounced [ʃa.bi t͡ʃil.ˈla]) is an ancient festival in Iran, Kurdistan, Uzbekistan, Tajikistan, Afghanistan, Azerbaijan and Turkmenistan that is celebrated on the winter solstice of the Northern Hemisphere. This corresponds to the night of December 21 (or 20 during leap years) in the Gregorian calendar, and to the night between the last day of the ninth month (Azar) and the first day of the tenth month (Dey) of the Iranian solar calendar. The longest and darkest night of the year is a time when friends and family gather together to eat, drink and read poetry (especially Hafez) and Shahnameh until well after midnight. Fruits and nuts are eaten and pomegranates and watermelons are particularly significant. The red colour in these fruits symbolizes the crimson hues of dawn and the glow of life. The poems of Divan-e Hafez, which can be found in the bookcases of most Iranian families, are read or recited on various occasions such as this festival and Nowruz. According to Iranian researcher Zana Salehrad, the continued celebration of Yalda Night in Iranian-speaking cultures can be seen as a sign of the continuity of cultural memory and the adaptation of ancient traditions to new social structures. In his research, he points out that the celebration has its roots in solar rituals that were held in pre-Zoroastrian times to celebrate the rebirth of the sun on the longest night of the year. Shab-e Yalda was officially added to UNESCO Intangible Cultural Heritage Lists in December 2022.

== Names ==
The longest and darkest night of the year marks "the night opening the initial forty-day period of the three-month winter", from which the name Chilla, "fortieth", derives. There are all together three 40-day periods, one in summer, and two in winter. The two winter periods are known as the "great Chilla" period (1 Day to 11 Bahman, 40 full days), followed/overlapped by the "small Chilla" period (10 Bahman to 30 Bahman, 20 days + 20 nights = 40 nights and days). Shab-e Chilla is the night opening the "big Chilla" period, that is the night between the last day of autumn and the first day of winter. The other name of the festival, 'Yaldā', is ultimately borrowing from Syriac-speaking Christians. According to Dehkhoda,

Yalda is a Syriac word meaning birthday, and because people have adapted Yalda night with the nativity of Messiah, it's called the name; however, the celebration of Christmas (Noël) established on December 25, is set as the birthday of Jesus. Yalda is the beginning of winter and the last night of autumn, and it is the longest night of the year.

In the first century, significant numbers of Eastern Christians were settled in Parthian and Sasanian territories, where they had received protection from religious persecution. Through them, Iranians (i.e. Parthians, Persians etc.) came in contact with Christian religious observances, including, it seems, Nestorian Christian Yalda, which in Syriac (a Middle Aramaic dialect) literally means "birth" but in a religious context was also the Syriac Christian proper name for Christmas, and which—because it fell nine months after Annunciation—was celebrated on eve of the winter solstice. The Christian festival's name passed to the non-Christian neighbors and although it is not clear when and where the Syriac term was borrowed into Persian, gradually 'Shab-e Yalda' and 'Shab-e Chilla' became synonymous and the two are used interchangeably.

== History ==
Yalda Night was one of the holy nights in ancient Iran and included in the official calendar of the Iranian Achaemenid Empire from at least 502 BCE under Darius I. Many of its modern festivities and customs remain unchanged from this period.

Ancient peoples such as the Aryans and Indo-Europeans were well attuned to natural phenomena such as the changing of seasons, as their daily activities were dictated by the availability of sunlight, while their crops were impacted by climate and weather. They found that the shortest days are the last days of autumn and the first night of winter, and that immediately after, the days gradually become longer and the nights shorter.

== The Iranian calendar ==
The Iranian (Persian) calendar was founded and framed by Hakim Omar Khayyam.

The history of Persian calendars initially points back to the time when the region of modern-day Persia celebrated their new years according to the Zoroastrian calendar. As Zoroastrianism was then the main religion in the region, their years consisted of "Exactly 365 days, distributed among twelve months of 30 days each plus five special month-less days, known popularly as the ‘stolen ones’, or, in religious parlance, as the ‘five Gatha Days'".

Before the creation of the Solar Hijri calendar, the Jalali calendar was put in place through the order of Sulṭān Jalāl al-Dīn Malikshāh-i Saljūqī in the 5th c. A.H. According to the Biographical Encyclopedia of Astronomers, “After the death of Yazdigird III (the last king of the Sassanid dynasty), the Yazdigirdī Calendar, as a solar one, gradually lost its position, and the Hijrī Calendar replaced it”.

Yalda Night is celebrated on winter solstice, the longest and darkest night of the year.

== Customs and traditions ==
In Zoroastrian tradition the longest and darkest night of the year was a particularly inauspicious day, and the practices of what is now known as "Shab-e Chilla/Yalda" were originally customs intended to protect people from evil (see dews) during that long night, at which time the evil forces of Ahriman were imagined to be at their peak. People were advised to stay awake most of the night, lest misfortune should befall them, and people would then gather in the safety of groups of friends and relatives, share the last remaining fruits from the summer, and find ways to pass the long night together in good company. The next day (i.e. the first day of Dae month) was then a day of celebration, (Note: The first day (Ormuzd day) of Dae month was/is the first of the four name-day feast days of the Creator Ahura Mazda (Dae, "Creator"; Ormuzd = Ahura Mazda), for which Al-Biruni notes that in earlier times, "on the day and month both called by the name of God, i.e. (Hormuzd), [...] the king used to descend from the throne of the empire in white dresses, [...] suspend all the pomp of royalty, and exclusively give himself up to considerations of the affairs of the realm and its inhabitants." Anyone could address the king, and the monarch would meet with commoners, eat and drink with them, and he would declare his brothership with them, and acknowledge his dependency on them (Albîrûnî, "Dai-Mâh", On the Festivals in the Months of the Persians in The Chronology of Ancient Nations, tr. Sachau, pp. 211–212).) and (at least in the 10th century, as recorded by Al-Biruni), the festival of the first day of Dae month was known as Ḵorram-ruz (joyful day) or Navad-ruz (ninety days [left to Nowruz]). Although the religious significance of the long dark night has been lost, the old traditions of staying up late in the company of friends and family have been retained in Iranian culture to the present day.

References to other older festivals held around the winter solstice are known from both Middle Persian texts as well as texts of the early Islamic period. In the 10th century, Al-Biruni mentions the mid-year festival (Maidyarem Gahanbar) that ran from 11-15 Dae. This festival is generally assumed to have been originally on the winter solstice, and which gradually shifted through the introduction of intercalation.^{cf.} Al-Biruni also records an Adar Jashan festival of fire celebrated on the intersection of Adar day (9th) of Azar (9th), which is the last autumn month. This was probably the same as the fire festival called Shahrevaragan (Shahrivar day of Shahrivar month), which marked the beginning of winter in Tokarestan. In 1979, journalist Hashem Razi theorized that Mehregan — the day-name festival of Mithra that in pre-Islamic times was celebrated on the autumn equinox and is today still celebrated in the autumn — had in early Islamic times shifted to the winter solstice. (Note: Razi, Hashem (1979), Gahshomari wa jashnha-e iran-e bastan, (Time-calculation and Festivals of ancient Iran), Tehran, pp. 565–631, repr. 2001.) Razi based his hypothesis on the fact that some of the poetry of the early Islamic era refers to Mihragan in connection with snow and cold. Razi's theory has a significant following on the Internet, but while Razi's documentation has been academically accepted, his adduction has not. Sufism's Chella, which is a 40-day period of retreat and fasting, is also unrelated to winter solstice festival.

Food plays a central role in the present-day form of the celebrations. In most parts of Iran the extended family come together and enjoy a fine dinner. A wide variety of fruits and sweetmeats specifically prepared or kept for this night are served. Foods common to the celebration include watermelon, pomegranate, nuts, and dried fruit. These items and more are commonly placed on a korsi, which people sit around. In some areas it is custom that forty varieties of edibles should be served during the ceremony of the night of Chilla.

Light-hearted superstitions run high on the night of Chilla. These superstitions, however, are primarily associated with consumption. For instance, it is believed that consuming watermelons on the night of Chilla will ensure the health and well-being of the individual during the months of summer by protecting him from falling victim to excessive heat or disease produced by hot humors. In Khorasan, there is a belief that whoever eats carrots, pears, pomegranates, and green olives will be protected against the harmful bite of insects, especially scorpions, and that eating garlic on this night protects one against pains in the joints.

In Khorasan, a popular ceremony associated with Yalda is preparing kafbikh, a kind of traditional Iranian sweet made in Khorasan, especially in the cities of Gonabad and Birjand.

After dinner the older individuals entertain the others by telling them tales and anecdotes. Another favorite and prevalent pastime of the night of Chilla is fāl-e Ḥāfeẓ, which is divination using the Dīvān of Hafez (i.e. bibliomancy). It is believed that one should not divine by the Dīvān of Hafez more than three times, however, or the poet may get angry.

Activities common to the festival include staying up past midnight, conversation, drinking, reading poems out loud, telling stories and jokes, and, for some, dancing. Prior to the invention and prevalence of electricity, decorating and lighting the house and yard with candles was also part of the tradition, but few have continued this tradition. Another tradition is giving dried fruits and nuts and gift to family and friends specially to the bride, wrapped in tulle and tied with ribbon (similar to wedding and shower "party favors"). In Khorasan, giving gifts to the bride is historically obligatory.

== Gallery ==
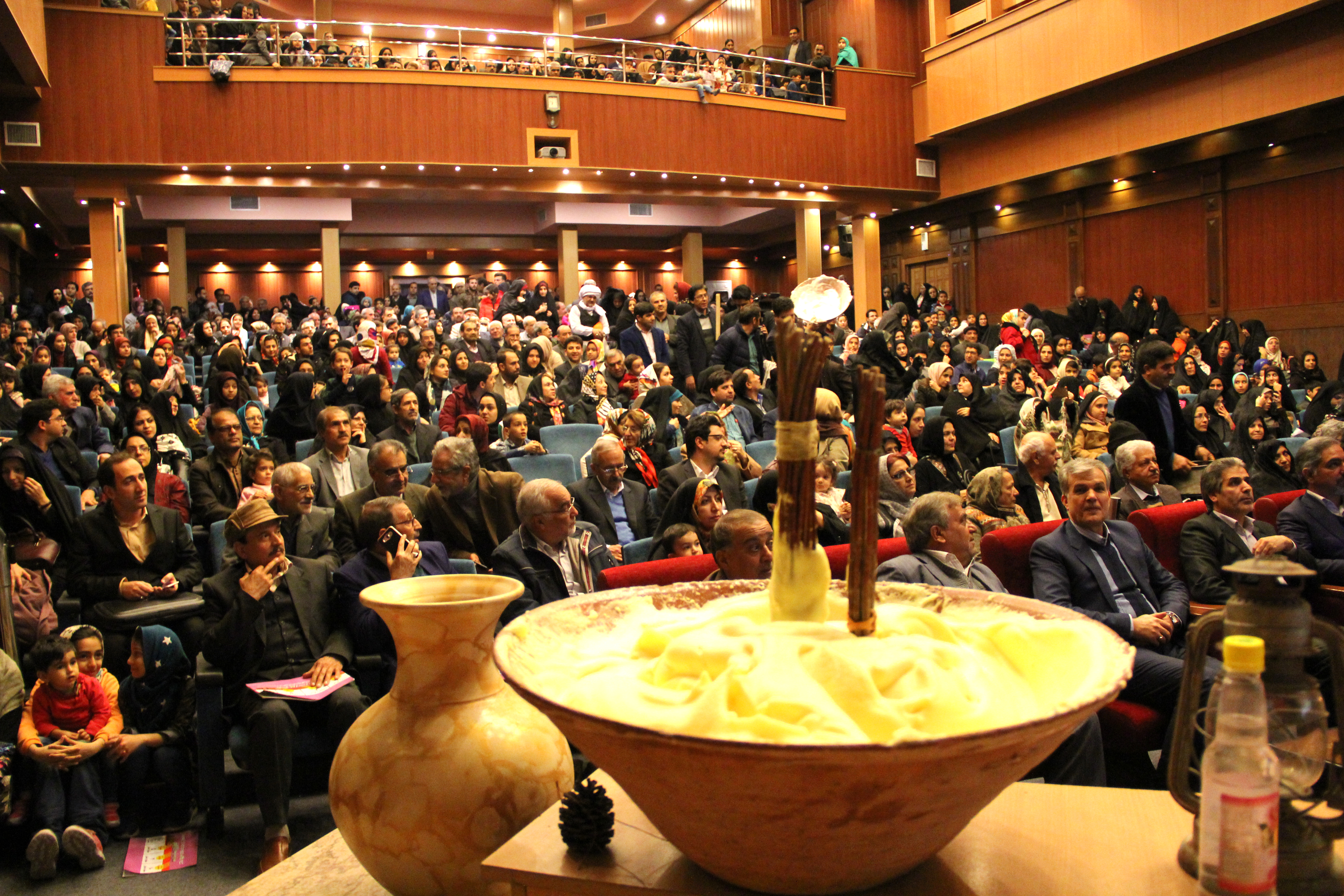
Kafbikh (Yalda sweets) in public Yalda ceremony in Mashhad, 2016

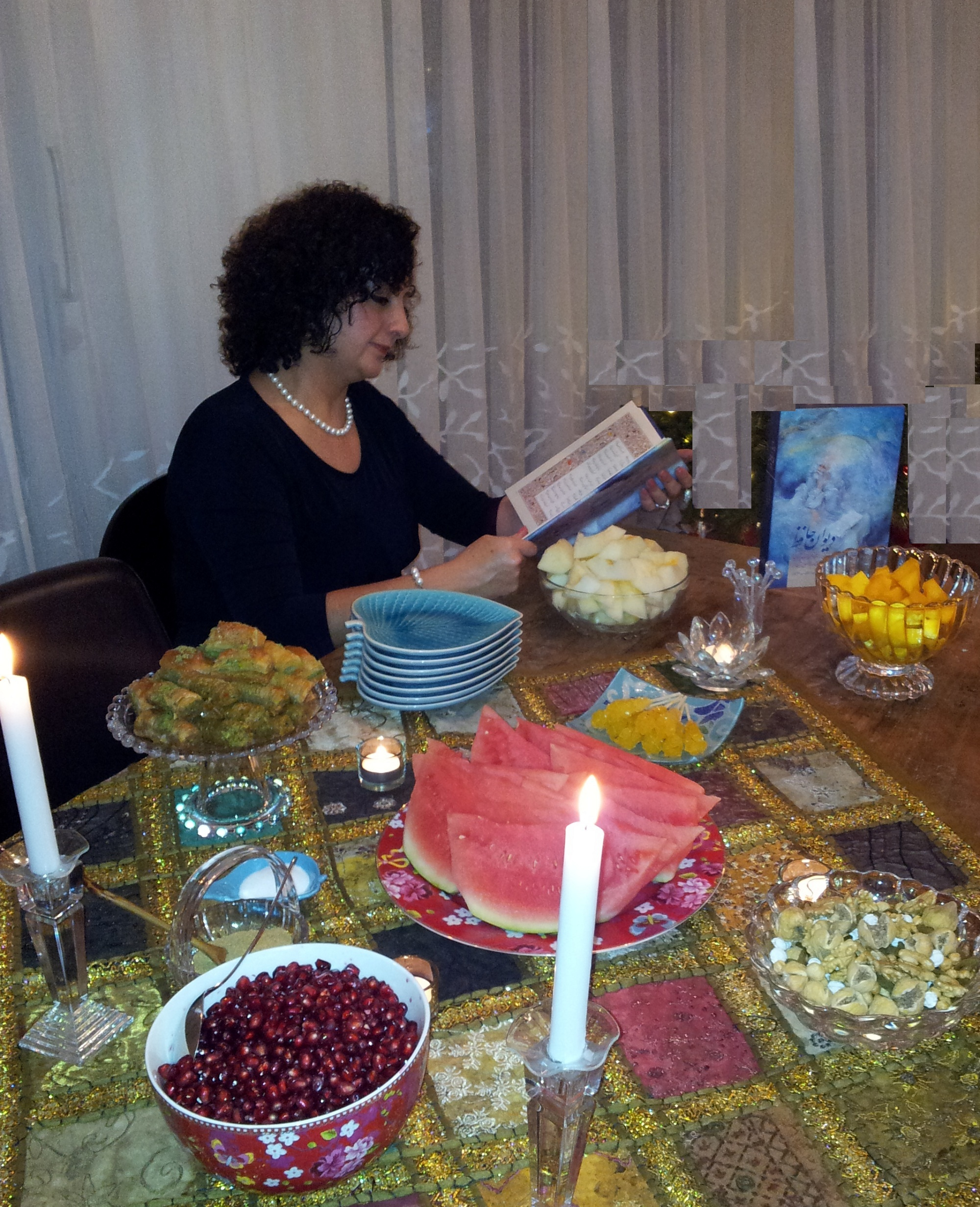
Iranian lady recites Hafez poems on Yalda Night

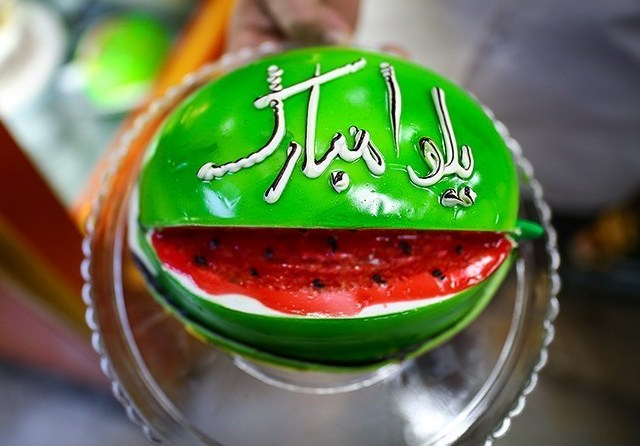
Yaldā Night shopping in Piranshahr, Kordestan

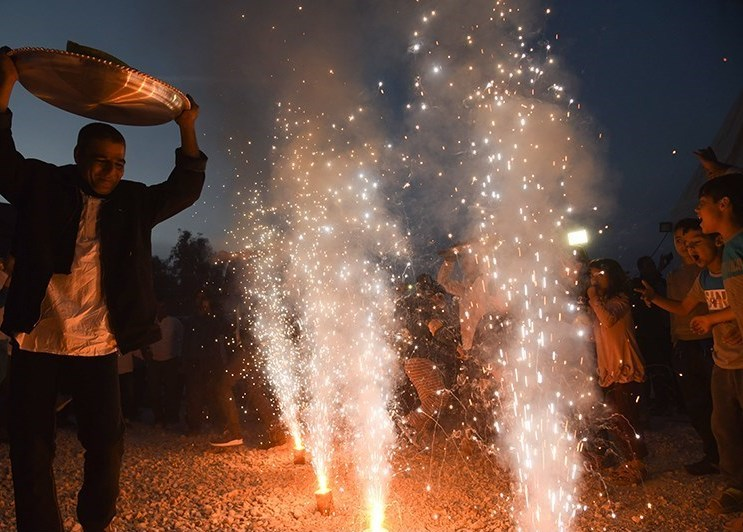
2017 Yaldā Night at Sarpol-e Zahab

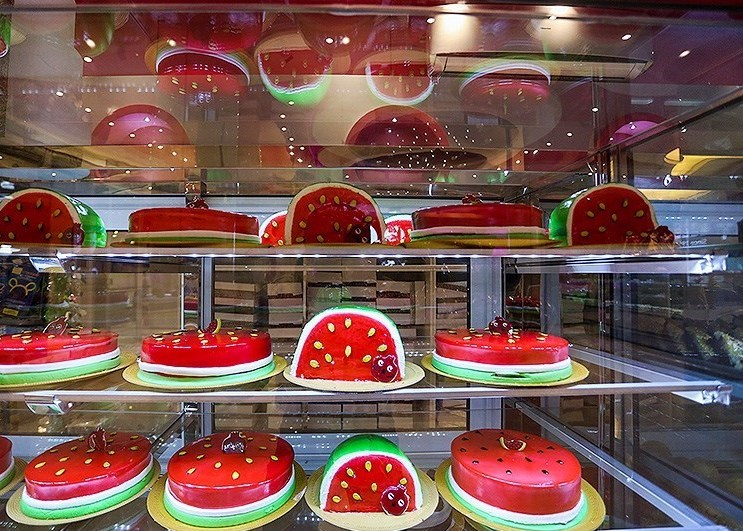
Yaldā Night cakes in Isfahan

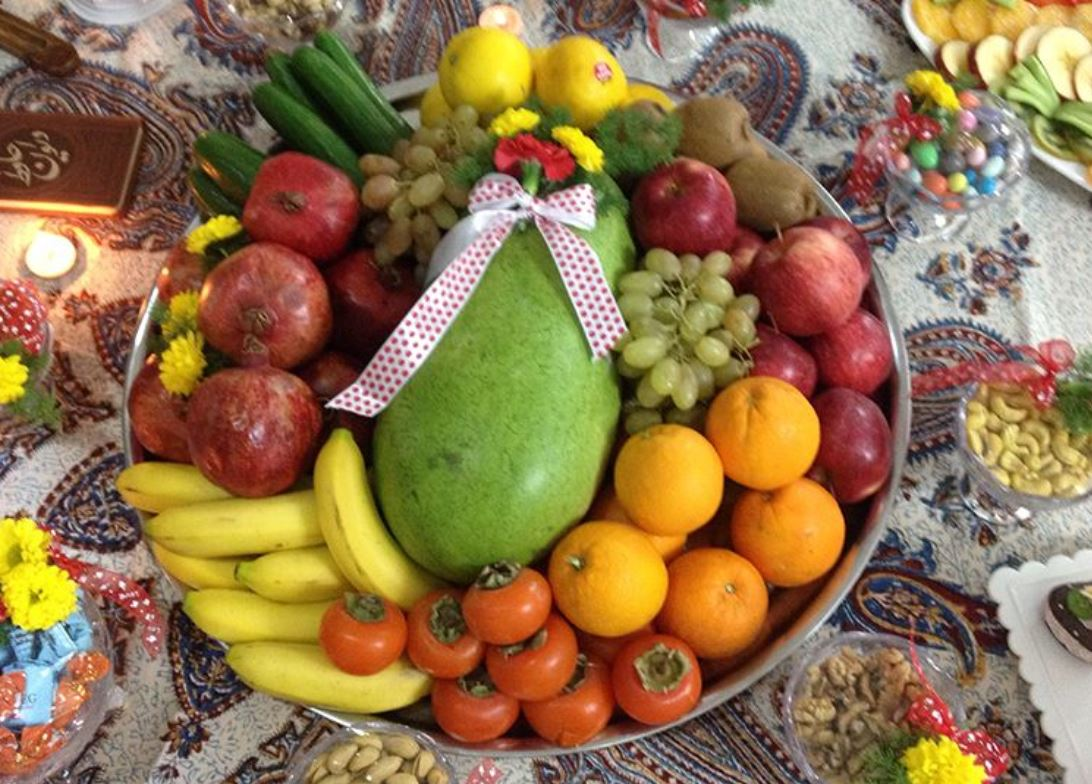
Fruits and Divan of Hafez on Yaldā Night

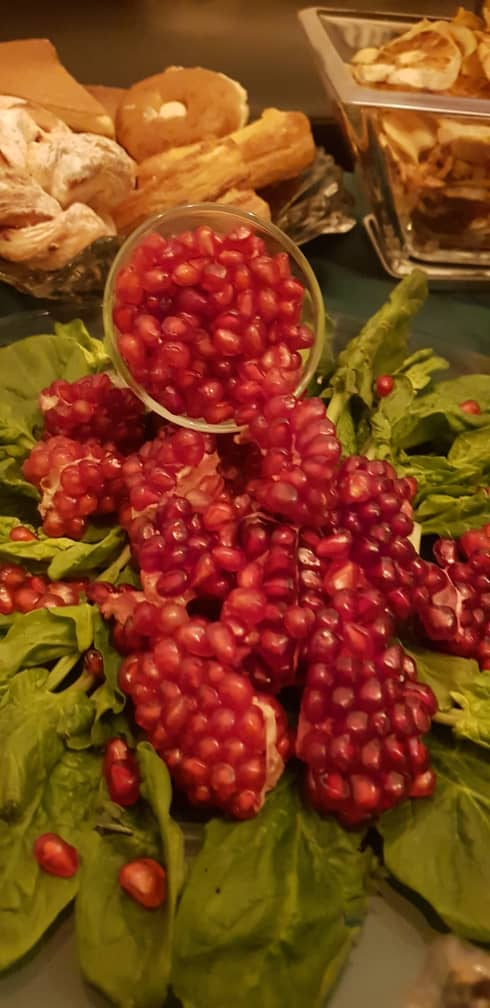
Pomegranates are often associated with Yalda in Iran, and are commonly eaten on Yalda Night.

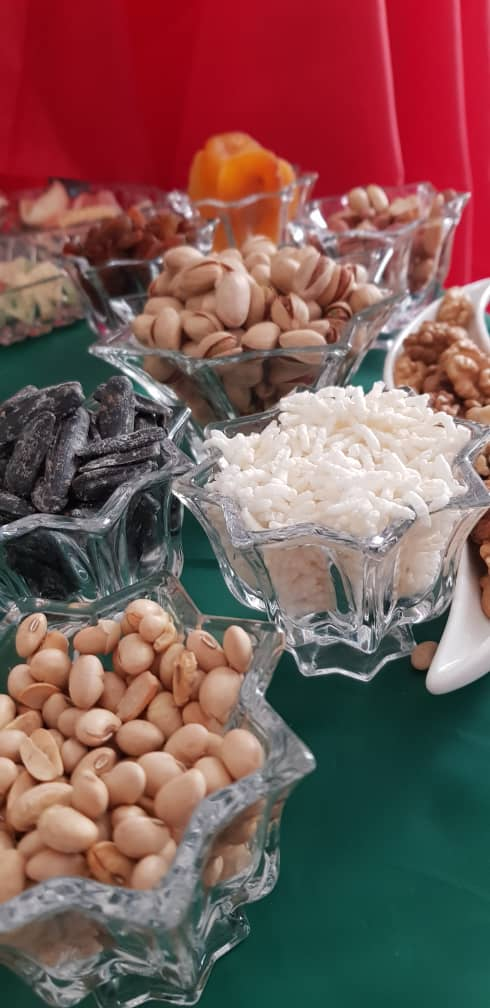
Various nuts, such as walnuts and pistachios, are eaten on Yalda Night.

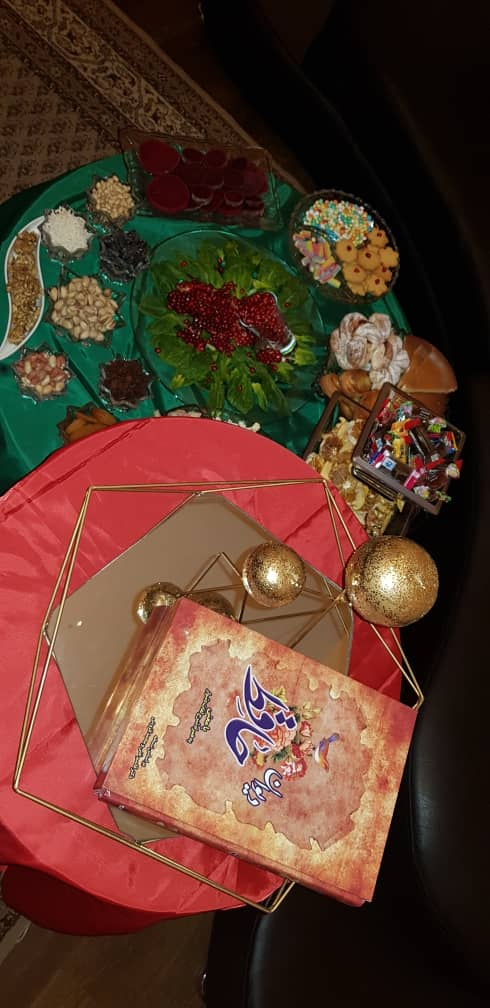
The book of Ghazals of Hafez, often read on Yalda Night.

== See also ==
- Dongzhi Festival
- Hanukkah
- Mehregan
- Tirgan
