= Kamancello II: Voyage =

Studio album by Raphael Weinroth-Browne & Shahriyar Jamshidi
- Released: May 25, 2019
- Recorded: April 2016
- Studio: Union Sound Company, Toronto, Canada
- Genre: Instrumental; world; Improvisations
- Length: 49:22

Raphael Weinroth-Browne & Shahriyar Jamshidi chronology
Kamancello (2017)	Kamancello II: Voyage (2019)	Of Shadows (2020)

Kamancello II: Voyage is the second album by Canadian duo Kamancello Raphael Weinroth Browne, cellist and Shahriyar Jamshidi, Kamanche player. This album has released as a self-published project in CD format in Canada and digitally worldwide.

Kamancello II: Voyage is a full-length improvisation album consists of four tracks which are based on improvisation themes from West Asian and Western Classical music.

== Track listing ==
No.	Title	Length
2.	"Kamancello II:Voyage: I. Emergent; II. Tenebrous; III. Voyage; IV. Tenebrous"	49:22: 12:03; 15:38; 07:25; 14:53
Total length:		49:22

== Personnel ==
- Shahriyar Jamshidi – Kamanche
- Raphael Weinroth-Brwone – cello
- Leon Taheny – recording and mixing
- Fedge – mastering
- Maahy – artwork
- Isaac Vallentin – layout
