= Kamancello (album) =

Studio album by Shahriyar Jamshidi and Raphael Weinroth-Browne
- Released: October 13, 2017
- Recorded: April 2016, Union Sound Company, Toronto, Canada
- Genre: Instrumental, world, Improvisation
- Length: 49:25

Shahriyar Jamshidi and Raphael Weinroth-Browne chronology
Kamancello (2017)	Kamancello II: Voyage (2019)

Professional ratings
Review scores
Source	Rating
Exclaim!	7/10

Kamancello is the debut full-length album by Canadian duo Kamancello. Kamancello is composed of cellist Raphael Weinroth-Browne and Kamanche player Shahriyar Jamshidi. The album was released independently on October 13, 2017.

Kamancello is a fully improvised album consisting of 6 tracks that combine features of West Asian and Western Classical music.

== Track listing ==
All tracks are written by Shahriyar Jamshidi and Raphael Weinroth-Browne

No.	Title	Length
1.	"Kamancello": "I. Incantation"; "II. Serpentine"; "III. Radiance"; "IV. Confrontation"; "V. Solitude"; "VI. Ascent"	49:25 8:20 7:16 8:57 5:53 9:24 9:25
Total length:		49:25

== Personnel ==
- Shahriyar Jamshidi – Kamanche
- Raphael Weinroth-Browne – Cello
- Leon Taheny – Recording and mixing
- Jeff "Fedge" Elliott – Mastering
- Raphael Weinroth-Browne - Artwork and photography
- Bryan W. Bray – Design and layout
