= Kafbikh =

Traditional Iranian sweet

Kafbikh (Persian: کفبیخ) is a type of traditional Iranian sweet made in Khorasan, specially in the cities of Gonabad and Birjand. It is a foodstuff eaten traditionally at Yalda, the ancient Persian celebration of the winter solstice.

== Preparation ==
Kaf is a marshmallow-like sweetmeat prepared from the root of the plant Acanthophyllum squarrosum, a member of the plant family Caryophyllaceae. The root is cleaned and boiled for a minimum of three times, the water being discarded after each preliminary boiling, until the liquid extract has lost all trace of bitterness and acquired a sweet smell and taste.

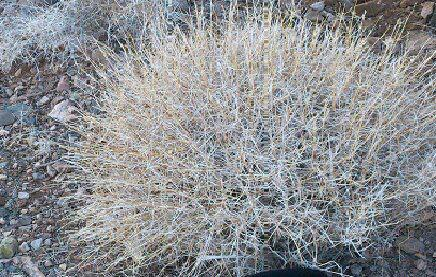
Acanthophyllum squarrosum

During this ceremony, the mucilaginous root of the plant Chubak, or Bikh (Acanthophyllum), is soaked in water and after several boilings, is placed in a large earthenware pot called a Tegar. Preparation is a family affair, family members taking it in turn to whisk the root decoction for hours on end, using daste gez - bunches of the thin twigs of the pomegranate tree - until the whipped mixture sets. This whipping must be carried out in cool environment for the liquid to foam correctly and the foam produced to harden and dry. Like the nougat-like Persian sweetmeat called Gaz (made traditionally in Isfahan) the prepared Kaf is sweetened by the addition of fruit juice, sugar or honey, and then decorated. Before the Kaf is sweetened youths are allowed to entertain the assembled company by throwing pieces of it at each other in a mock battle resembling a snowball fight, in which they rub the frothy confection on their opponents’ hair and faces. Guests given kaf are presented also with walnuts and pistachios (and sometimes also milk) to eat with it.

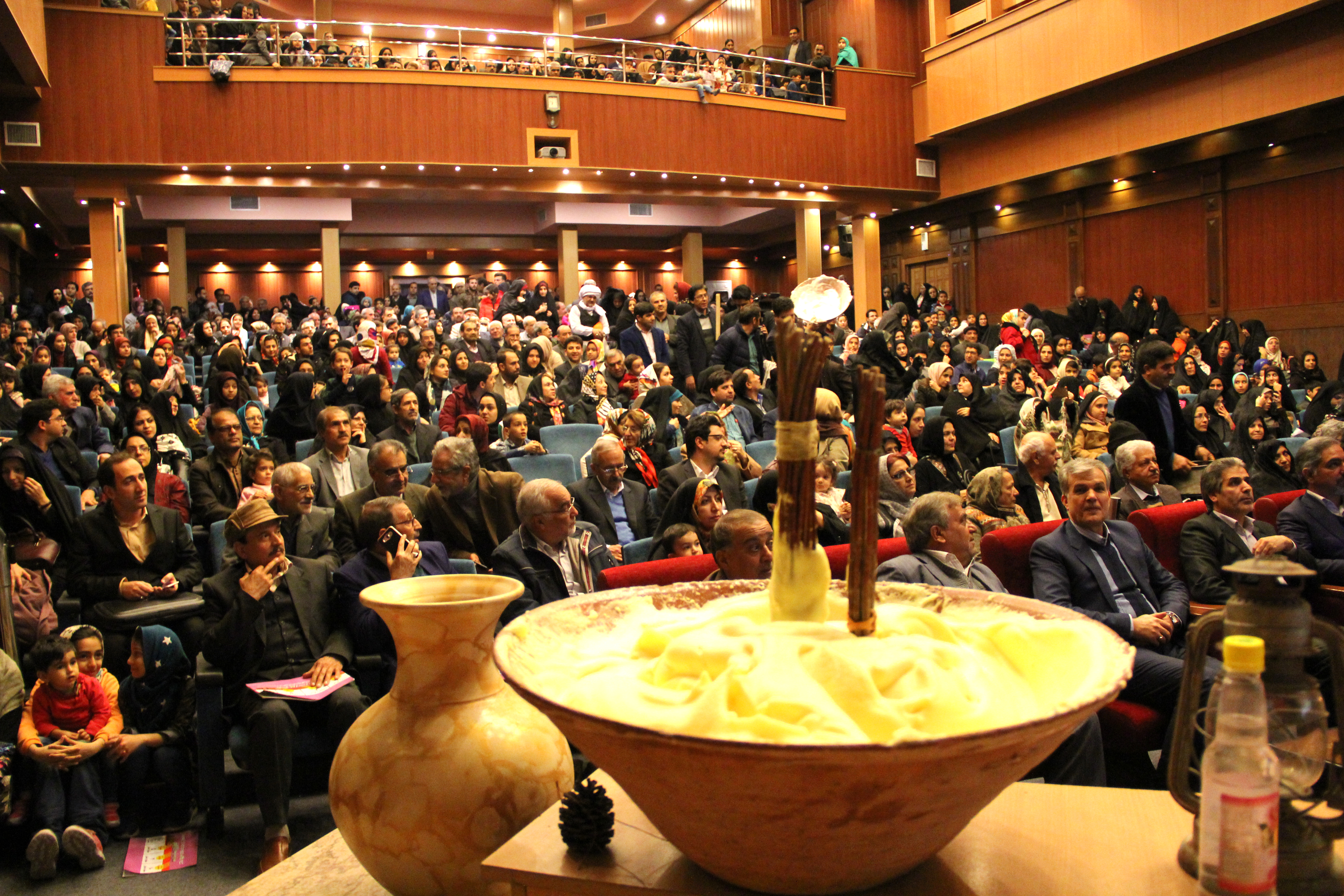
Yalda Festival in Iran featuring Kafbikh

Another custom performed in certain parts of Iran, particularly in Khorasan, on the night of Yalda (Chelleh) involves young engaged couples. The men send an edible arrangement combining seven kinds of fruits and a variety of gifts to their fiancées. In some areas, the girl and her family return the favor by sending gifts back to the young man.

== Gallery ==
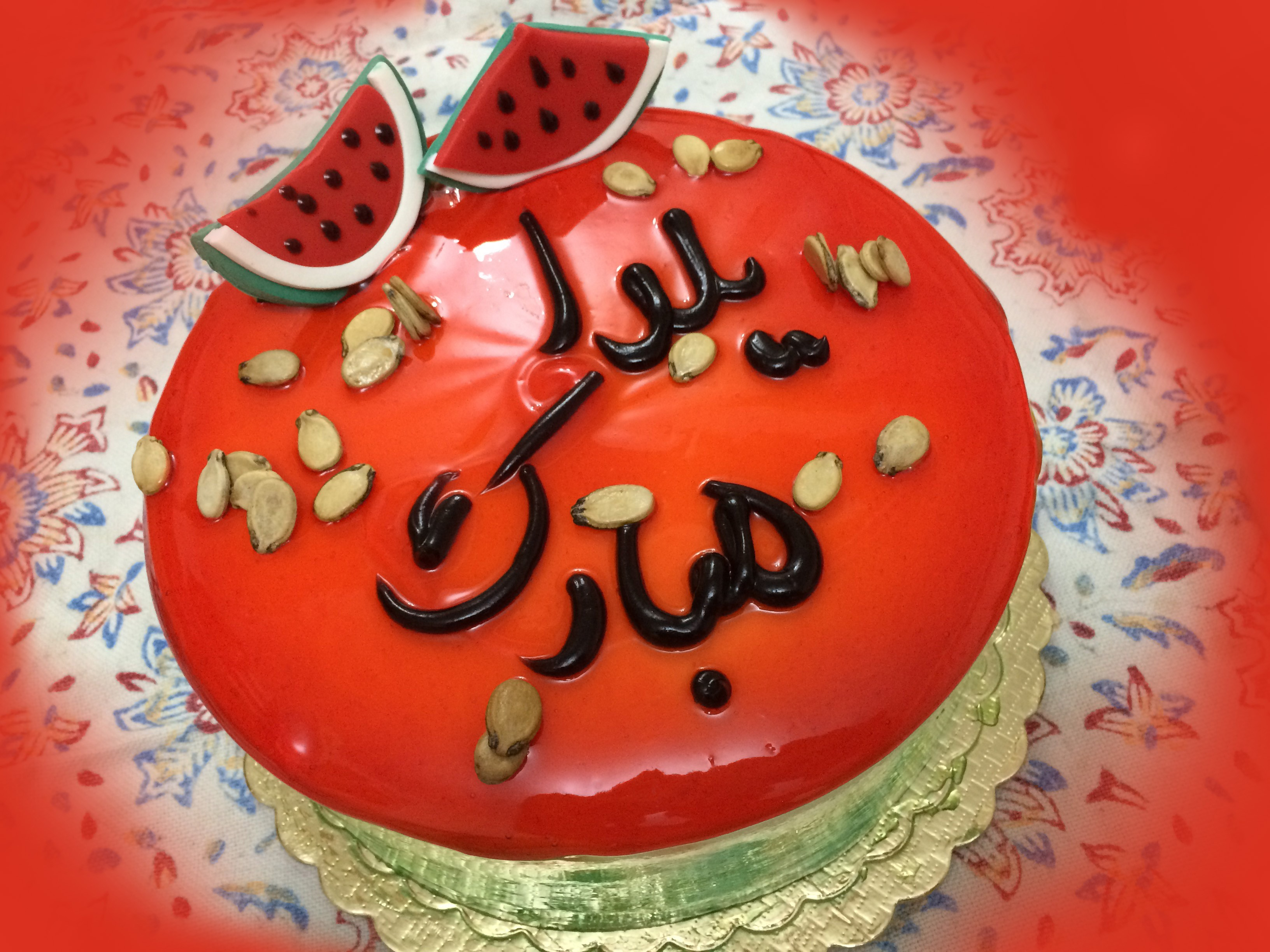
Yalda cake

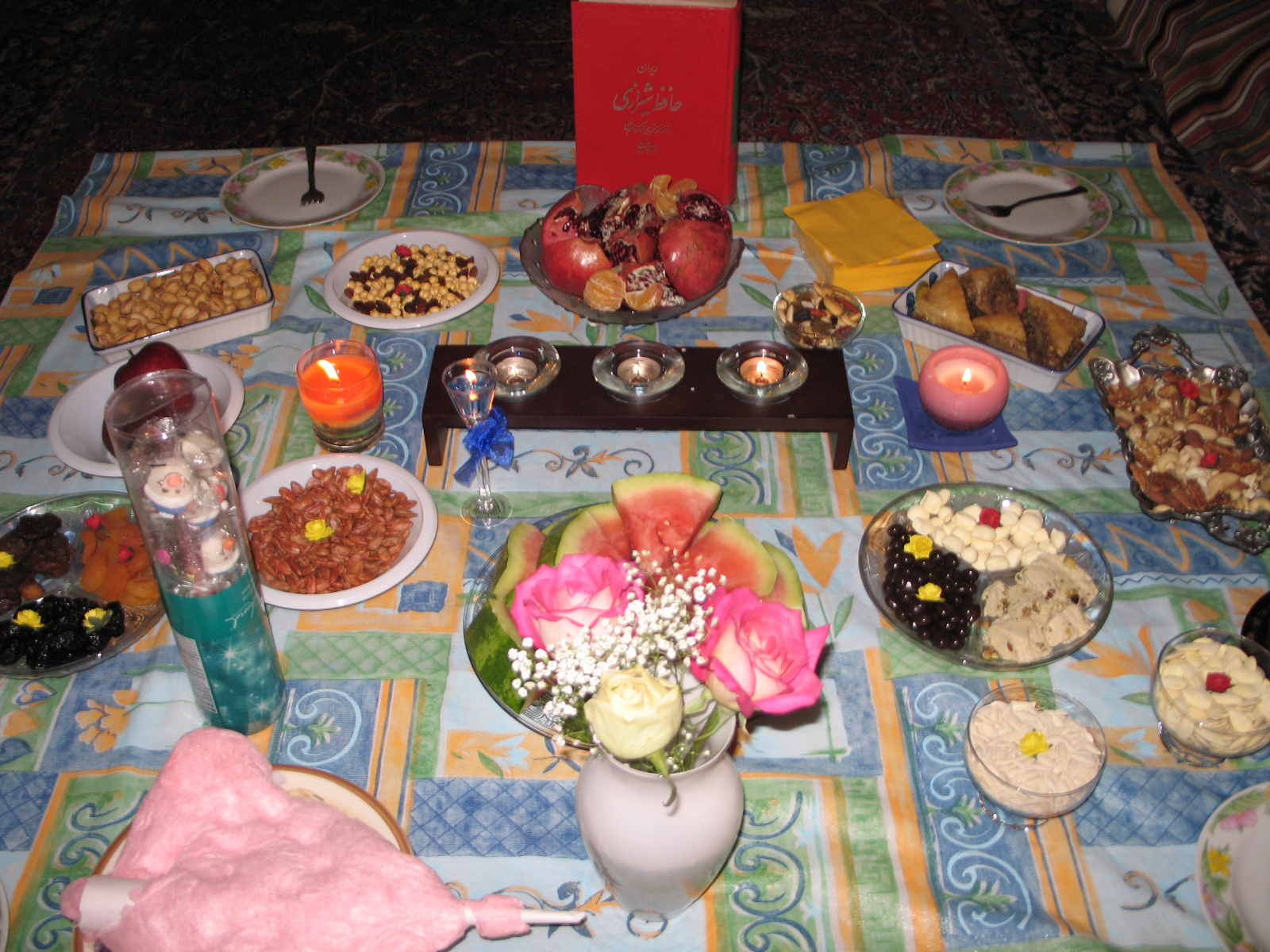
Traditional Yalda setting

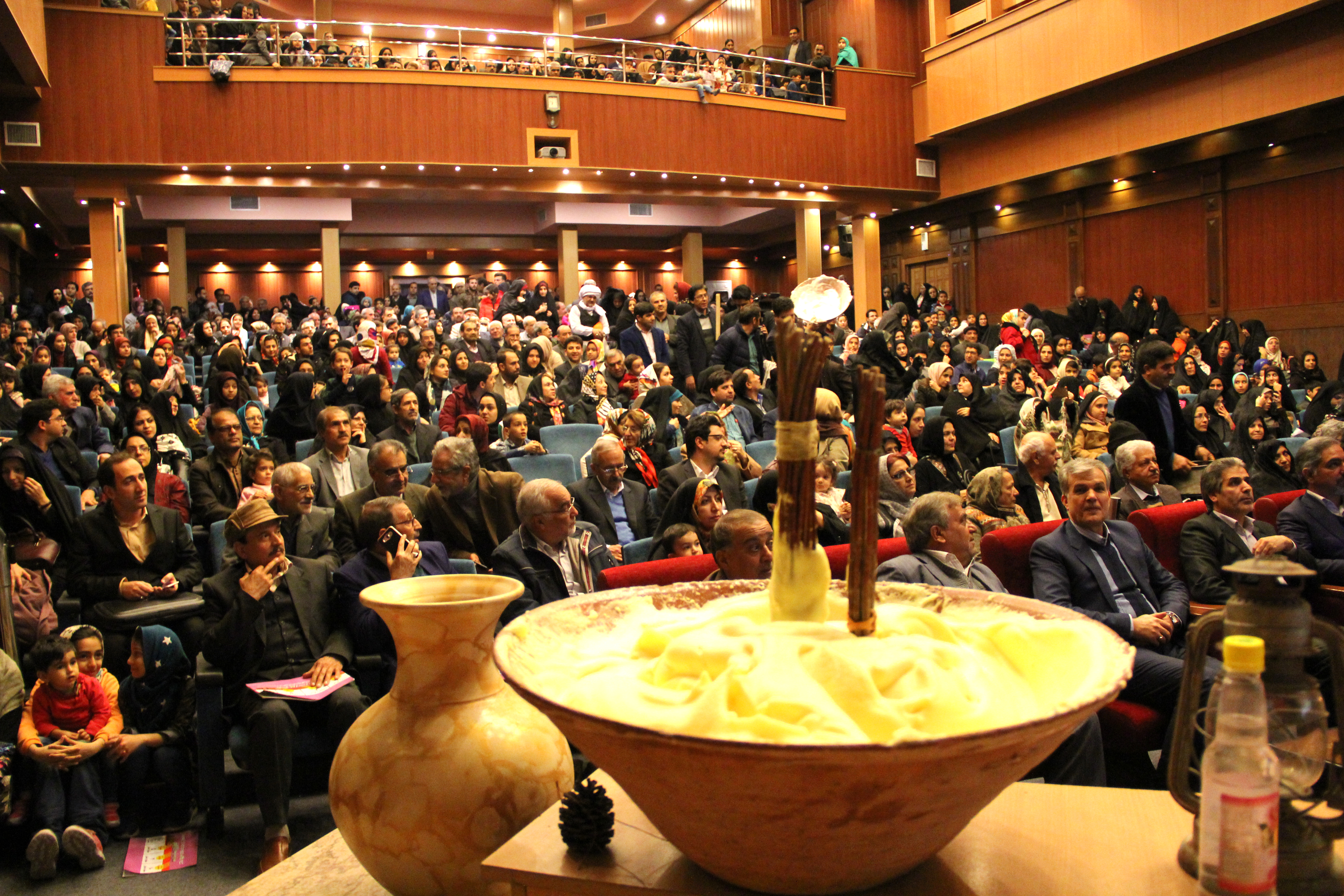
Yalda Festival in Iran featuring Kafbikh

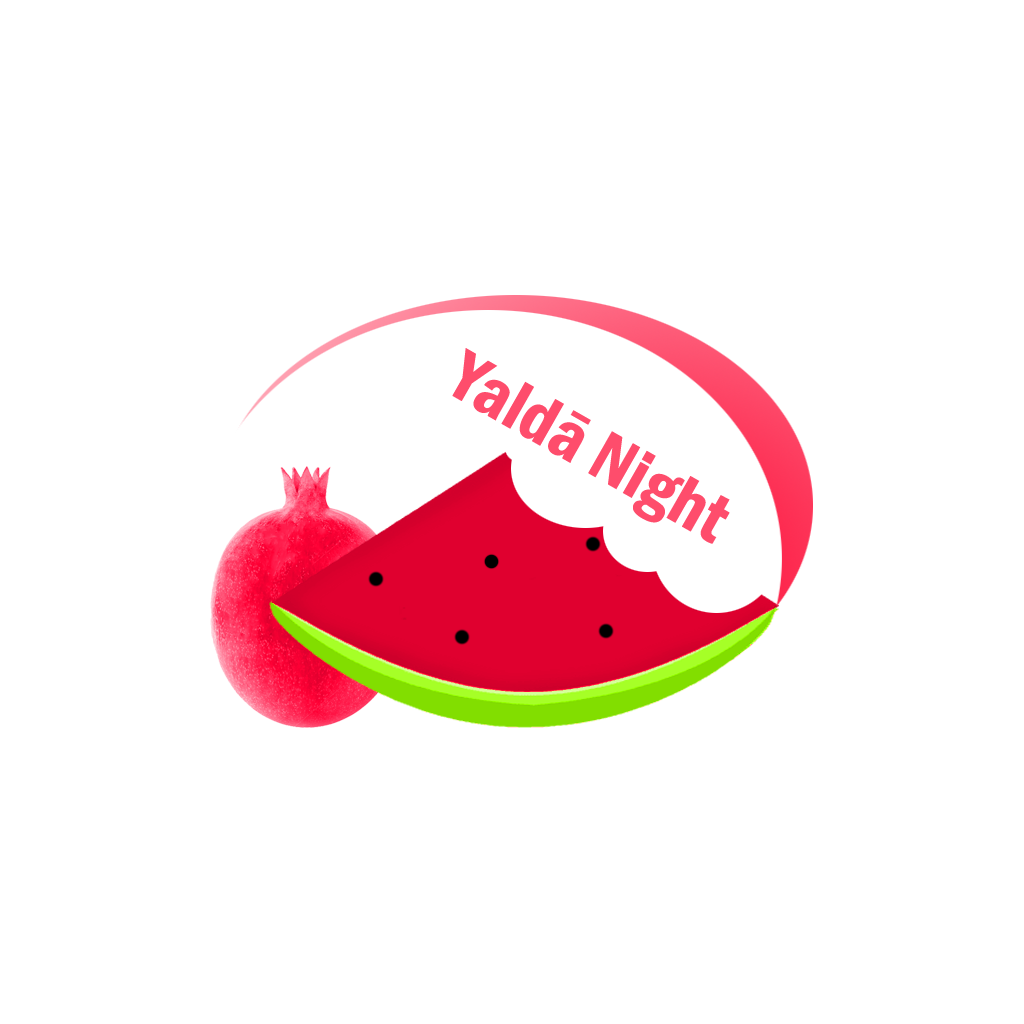
A logo designed for Yalda

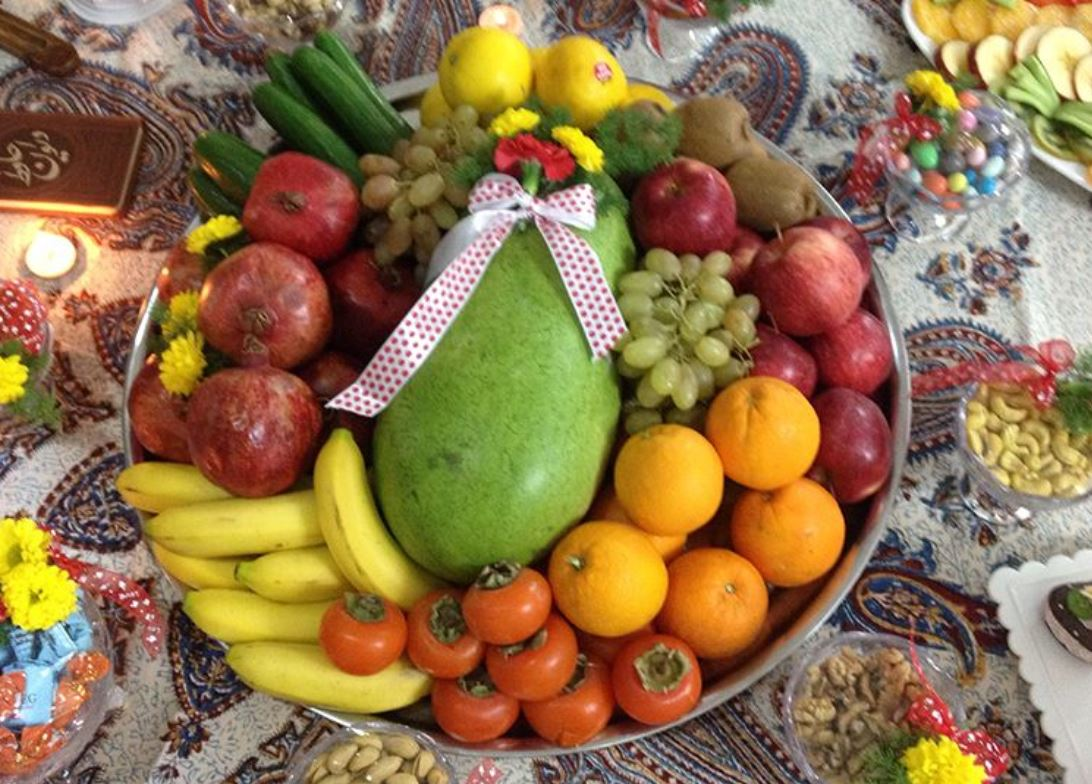
Traditional fruits on Yalda

== See also ==
- Nowruz
- Yalda
- Gonabad
- Zibad
- Jesuite
- Konditorei
- Kuo Yuan Ye Museum of Cake and Pastry
- List of baked goods
- List of desserts
- List of food preparation utensils
- List of pastries
- Mold (cooking implement)
- Pan dulce (sweet bread)
