= Tirgan =

Ancient Iranian and Zoroastrian Festival

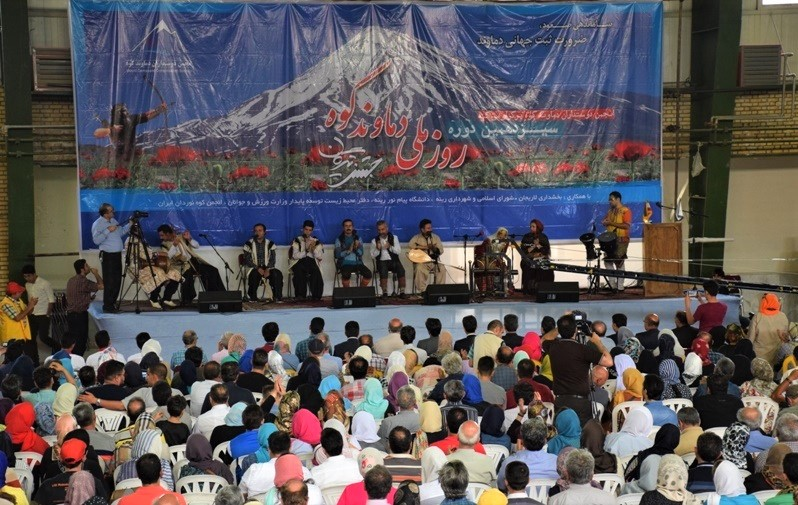
- Tirgan and Damavand National Day Festival at Amol
- Observed by: Iran; Tajikistan; Canada (by Iranian Canadians and Zoroastrians); European Union (by Iranians and Zoroastrians); United States (by Iranian Americans and Zoroastrians)
- Date: Tir 13 (July 3, 4, or 5)
- Frequency: Annual
- Related to: Nowruz, Mehrgan, Sade, Yalda

Tirgan (Persian: تیرگان, Tirgān), is an early summer ancient Iranian festival, celebrated annually on Tir 13 (July 2, 3, or 4). It is celebrated by splashing water, dancing, reciting poetry, and serving traditional foods such as spinach soup and sholezard. The custom of tying rainbow-colored bands on wrists, which are worn for ten days and then thrown into a stream, is also a way to rejoice for children.

== Overview ==
Tirgan is an ancient Iranian tradition which is still celebrated in various regions of Iran, including Mazenderan, Khorasan, and Arak. It is widely attested by historians such as Gardezi, Biruni, and Masudi, as well as European travelers during the Safavid era.

The celebration is dedicated to Tishtrya, a Yazata who appeared in the sky to generate thunder and lightning for much needed rain.

Legend says that Arash the Archer was a man chosen to settle a land dispute between the leaders of the lands Iran and Turan. Arash was to loose his arrow, on the 13th day of Tir, and where the arrow landed, would lie the border between the two kingdoms. Turan had suffered from the lack of rain, and Iran rejoiced at the settlement of the borders, then rain poured onto the two countries and there was peace between them.

It is stated in Biruni's chronology that "by the order of God, the wind bore the arrow away from the mountains of Amol and brought the utmost frontier of Khorasan between Fergana and Tapuria." Gardizi has given a similar description, although he notes that "the arrow of Arash fell in the area between Fargana and Bactria."

== Ceremony ==
Tirgan is celebrated every year in Mazandaran Province and Amol in northern Iran, the capital Tehran, Karaj, and the central and southern cities of Yazd, Meybod, Ardakan, Kerman, Bam, Shiraz, Isfahan, Ahvaz, and Farahan. Iranians of the Zoroastrian faith also celebrate this outside Iran, in Europe and the US.

Tirgan survives in the Caspian provinces of Mazandaran and Gilan as Tirema Sizda, meaning the 13th day of the month of Tir, which is celebrated in mid-summer do to gradual shift in the Caspian calendar.

== Zoroastrianism ==
In the Avesta, a religious text associated with Zoroastrianism, it is said: We praise Tishter, the star of the mighty and glorious, who swiftly moves towards that direction. The star Chisht flies towards it, speeding toward the vast ocean; just as that arrow in the air shot by Arash the archer, the greatest archer of the Aryans, was thrown from the mountain of Airwakhshoth towards the mountain of Khwanvant.

== See also ==
- Tirgan Festival
- Summer solstice
- Mehregan
- Nowruz
- Yalda
- Shast-Sheshi festival
