= Muhamad Salih Dilan =

Kurdish singer

- Born: 1927; Sulaymaniyah, Kurdistan
- Died: 28 October 1990 (aged 62–63); Sulaymaniyah, Kurdistan
- Occupations: Poet, Maqam singer
- Writing career
- Pen name: Dilan

Muhamad Salih Dilan (Kurdish: محه‌ممه‌د ساڵح دیلان) is regarded as one of the most influential Kurdish Poets and one of the greatest maqam singers of his time. He was one of the few early poets that brought a revolution in Kurdish poetry and literature in the 20th century.

== Biography ==
Dilan was born in Goizha, a neighborhood in Slemani. His family's origins were from Qala Chuwalan, along with the Kurdish Principality of Baban, they settled in Sulaimaniyah in 1784. His father, Ahmed Dilan was a poetry enthusiast and a maqam specialist, apart from Kurdish he was fluent in Persian and Arabic, he played a key role in his son's love for poetry and maqam. Dilan went to Xalidiye Primary School, before completing secondary school, his father became ill; family responsibilities fell on his shoulder and he had no choice but to leave school and work. He was offered a job at the local tobacco company as a Clerk.

== The poet ==
The first poem Dilan wrote was in 1948, at a festival, he recited the poem to the famous Kurdish nationalist poet Faiq Bekas.

According to Dilan himself, Bekas refused to believe he was the writer which most likely was due to the poem having such depth in meaning and strict lyricality.

== Newroz ==
In 1948, Dilan and his brother, Qadir Dilan, a musician, met with Piramerd in a Mewlewi street, the ageing philosopher took out his cigarette packet and wrote the Newroz poem on it before handing it over to them, he then asked if they could write a melody for the poem and if Dilan himself could sing it when Newroz arrives. It didn't take long before Qadir Dilan wrote the timeless Newroz melody with Dilan being the first artist to sing it on 21 March 1948. Today all over the cities of Kurdistan the song is played when Newroz arrives.

== In prison ==
From 1947 to 1966 Dilan was arrested, tortured and imprisoned for 13 years for his involvement in Kurdish independence movements and at times for his art, many of his poems were written while he was in prison in 1963 for writing "Rez" (In Kurdish: ڕه‌ز, In English: Vineyard), he served one year in prison.

There he recalls various events, Omar Kayyam's famous poem about the wind breaking his glass of wine and the blaming of God by the poet, the other event being Plato's supposed hiding in the wine vessels before his writings occurred, then Dilan compares them with the burning of the villages and the vineyards in the early 1960s by the Iraqi government. The poem is a comparison between three events yet the only connection between them is grape, Kayyam drinking the wine, Plato thinking inside the wine vessel and the vineyards burning in Kurdistan, the poem's deep meaning and contrast shows why it's considered a masterpiece of Kurdish poetry.

== Diwan of Dilan ==
Dilan's colleague Abdulla Agreen took on the task of collecting his poems and publishing a Diwan under the name Diwani Dilan. The book was published in 1987.

== Death ==
On 28 September 1990, Dilan died at the age of 63 and was buried at the Seywan cemetery in his hometown.

== See also ==
- List of Kurdish scholars
- Kurdish music
