= IdeasTap =

Former UK charitable organisation

IdeasTap was a UK charitable organisation established to aid people in the creative industry at the start of their careers. The organisation offered a variety of free resources, including showcasing opportunities, workshops, funding, mentoring and advice and membership was free. Despite an outcry from the creative community, the charity closed in 2015 due to a lack of public funding available to support it.

IdeasTap supported young people working in creative disciplines including theatre, film, photography and visual art, illustration, design, dance, performance art, poetry and creative writing. It also managed an online arts magazine, IdeasMag, which offered advice for emerging creatives through interviews and features. Members and their projects were also promoted through the magazine.

In March 2015 it was announced that IdeasTap would close on 2 June 2015 due to lack of funding.

== Details ==
IdeasTap was established in December 2008 by arts philanthropist Peter De Haan. Founding partners included Old Vic New Voices, National Youth Theatre and Polka Theatre.

The organisation made its first funding award in April 2009 to young theatre companies going to the Edinburgh Festival Fringe. A further £50,000 funding was awarded during that year through the Ideas Fund pilot scheme. In October 2011, membership of the site reached 50,000. In July 2013 membership reached 100,000 and it had awarded more than £1.5 million worth of direct funding and accompanying expert mentoring to emerging artists.

IdeasTap awards its funding, mentoring and support through creative briefs. Notable brief winners include HighTide Festival Theatre (Ideas Fund Edinburgh); RashDash (Ideas Fund Edinburgh); Sabrina Mahfouz (OVNV TS Eliot US/ UK Exchange) Folly for a Flyover (Innovators Fund); Pierfrancesco Celada (IdeasTap Photographic Award); Ella Hickson (OVNV 24 Hour Plays); Sarah Solemani (OVNV 24 Hour Plays); Nick Blood (Old Vic New Voices Theatre 503 Award). IdeasTap distributes its core funds through the Ideas Fund scheme, which is divided into five sections: Ideas Fund Innovators, Ideas Fund Shorts, Ideas Fund Green and the Top Up Fund.

Examples of opportunities offered to IdeasTap members include a workshop with the actor Kevin Spacey; a dance performance at the Champions League Final at Wembley Stadium; The IdeasTap and Magnum Photographic Award; the opportunity to participate in The 24 Hour Plays: Old Vic New Voices. Six emerging creative producers were also commissioned to create the Coming Up Festival. In June 2012, IdeasTap launched a scheme trading free office space for creative skills.

In May 2011, IdeasTap and Sky Arts launched the first round of the Sky Arts Ignition: Futures Fund. Through this bursary scheme, opera director Daisy Evans and visual artist Phoebe Boswell were each awarded £30,000 towards their creative development. A further three bursaries of £30,000 each were awarded to director Felix Mortimer, animator Drew Roper and performance artist Laurence Payot in May 2012. Drew Roper later went on to run a crowdfunding campaign for an additional £30,000 which many in the animation community found controversial.
