= Festival du Monde Arabe de Montréal =

Cultural festival in Quebec, Canada

Festival du Monde Arabe de Montréal FMA
- Location: Montreal, Quebec, Canada
- Language: Arabic, International
- Website: http://www.festivalarabe.com

Festival du Monde Arabe de Montréal also known as Festival du Monde Arabe (FMA) (in English Arab World Festival of Montreal, in Arabic مهرجان العالم العربي في مونتريال) is a major annual cultural festival in Montreal, Quebec, Canada dedicated to the arts of the Arab World. It was established in 2000 by Joseph Nakhlé and produced by "Alchimies, Créations et Cultures" and serves to develop a dialogue between Arab and Western cultures.

Diversified in its nature, it covers many forms of arts including dance, music, theater, multidisciplinary arts, visual arts and medias.

Each year a major theme is chosen. Annual themes have included

1. 2000: Journées 2000
2. 2001: Tentations
3. 2002: Vous avez dit arabe?
4. 2003: Dévoilée
5. 2004: Razzias
6. 2005: Harem
7. 2006: Prophètes rebelles
8. 2007: Espace Zéro
9. 2008: Liaisons andalouses
10. 2009: Mémoires croisées
11. 2010: Arabitudes
12. 2011: Charabia
13. 2012: Utopia
14. 2013: Tribales
15. 2014: 15 folies métèques
16. 2015: Hilarus Delirus
17. 2016: Aurores
18. 2017: Les trois' saisons en quart de ton
19. 2018: Chants de Mutants: Aux rives de Gibraltar
20. 2019: Au midi du monde, 20 ans d'acrobaties
21. 2020: Espace 01: Des univers à conquérir
22. 2021: Entracte

The festival also usually has four auxiliary sections: Arts de la scène, Salon de la culture, Cinéma et La Médina
