= Tirgan Festival =

Iranian cultural festival held in Toronto, Ontario

Logo of the Tirgan Festival

The Tirgan Festival (Persian: جشنواره تیرگان) is a biennial four-day celebration of Iranian arts and culture held in Toronto, Ontario, Canada. The Festival celebrates Iranian arts and culture through an array of artistic and literary disciplines including music, dance, cinema, theatre, history, literature and visual arts. The festivals are held in multiple locations in Toronto, such as the Harbourfront Centre, the Distillery District, and St. Lawrence Centre for the Arts. Tirgan Festival 2019 accommodated over 250 artists, 140 performances, and professional speakers.

== History ==
Originally showcased under the name, Under the Azure Dome, Tirgan 2006 celebrated Nowruz (the Persian New Year) as well as Iranian arts and culture on a mass scale. The festival was held between March 17 and March 19, 2006 at Toronto's Harbourfront Centre and featured over one hundred performers in dance, music, theatre, cinema, and visual arts. It drew 25,000 visitors from all over the world. In 2008, Tirgan featured artists including Ostad Mohammad Reza Lotfi, Saeed Shanbehzadeh, and Shahrokh Moshkin-Ghalam. Tirgan 2008 attracted over 60,000 visitors to more than 50 performances. With more than 70 performances by over 150 artists from around the globe, organized by over 300 volunteers, Tirgan 2011 attracted 120,000 visitors to become the world's largest Iranian festival.

== The Legend of Tirgan ==
Tirgan refers to an ancient Iranian festival. There are various legends concerning its origins. One legend describes how Iran and Turan, two long-standing enemies, decided to declare peace by drawing the boundaries between the two empires. Arash, the best archer in the Iranian army, was chosen to ascend Mount Damavand to shoot an arrow, with the landing location determining the boundary. Iranians watched in hope as the arrow flew from dawn until noon, expanding the boundaries of Iran beyond all expectations. What resulted was the inclusion of many diverse cultures throughout the territory of Iran. Tirgan became a celebration of that diversity.

== Organization ==
The Tirgan Festival is organized by the Iranian-Canadian Centre for Art and Culture, a non-profit, non-partisan, and non-religious organization, registered under the Ontario Corporation Act.

=== Funding & Support ===
Tirgan relies primarily on donations from the community, grants from the federal, provincial, and municipal tiers of the Canadian Government, and corporate sponsorships.
