= Masoud Bakhtiari =

Iranian teacher, poet and singer (1940–2006)

Ostad Masoud Bakhtiari
- مسعود بختیاری
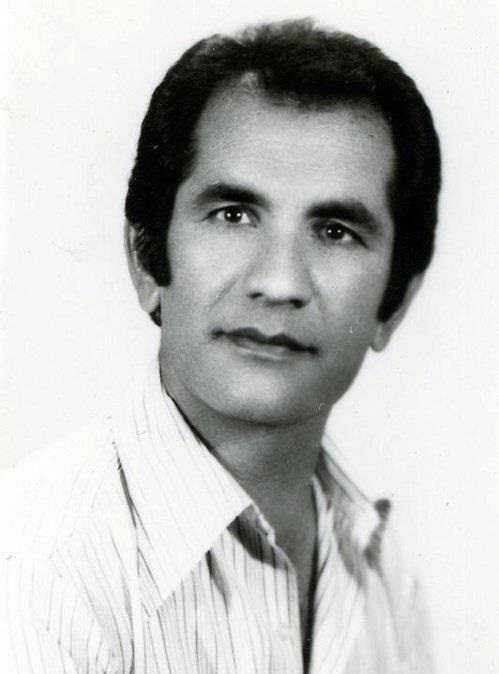
- Born: Bahman Alaeddin; October 12, 1940; Masjed Soleyman, Pahlavi Iran
- Died: November 3, 2006 (aged 66); Karaj, Iran
- Burial place: Emamzadeh Taher, Karaj, Iran
- Occupations: Singer, songwriter, composer, teacher
- Musical career
- Genre: Iranian folk music
- Instrument: Vocals
- Label: Hamavaz

Bahman Alaeddin (Persian: بهمن علاءالدین; October 12, 1940 – November 3, 2006), commonly known by his stage name as Masoud Bakhtiari (Persian: مسعود بختیاری) was an Iranian singer, songwriter, composer, and teacher. In his songs, all of them were spoken in his native Bakhtiari, a dialect of the Luri language. He had also composed poetry, often in Bakhtiari, but occasionally, as well in Persian.

== Biography ==
Bahman Alaeddin was born on October 12, 1940, in Masjed Soleyman, in the Khuzestan province of Pahlavi Iran, when the Pahlavi dynasty had ruled the country. His parents were Hajjieh Limu Khanom and Mirza Mohammad Karim. As a Bakhtiari, he was from the Haft Lang ethnic group from the Behdarvand clan from Bakhtiarvand.

Before the revolution, with the help of Mansour Ghanadpour, a Santoor musician, presented works in both Bakhtiari and Persian and the mood in urban music.

After completing secondary education at that time, Alaeddin served in education and served as a teacher until he retired. The beginning of his cooperation with Radio Ahvaz (now Khuzestan Network) and Mansour Ghanadpour, while teaching at the same time in Ahvaz.

In 1979 his career temporarily stalled as the Islamic Revolution had been taking place, during this period, his Kurdish friend Mohammad Hossein Sefizadeh would introduce him to Ata Janguk, a fellow musician who was professional in the tar and setar from the city of Lar, located in the Fars province, despite Janguk not being Bakhtiari, his culture was very close to them as these instruments were common amongst both of their respective cultures.

== Late life and death ==
Bakhtiari was never married. He disliked attending gatherings and parties. In 2000, after his retirement Bakhtiari moved to sister's apartment in Karaj, Iran. It was in here in which he needed to have bladder surgery.

Bakhtiari passed away at the age of 66 due to both kidney disease and heart failure on November 3, 2006, in Karaj. He was subsequently buried in the Emamzadeh Taher cemetery at Karaj, this site was chosen due to many famous musicians and poets being buried here such as Gholamhossein Banan, Habibollah Badie, Morteza Hannaneh, Nematollah Aghasi, Delkash, and Houshang Golshiri.

In Bakhtiari tradition, when somebody passes away and is buried far from their birthplace a statue would be made there for their honor (Mafeh Geh), a statue of Masoud Bakhtiari was made by his honor in the Taraz mountains, near the city of Masjed Soleyman.

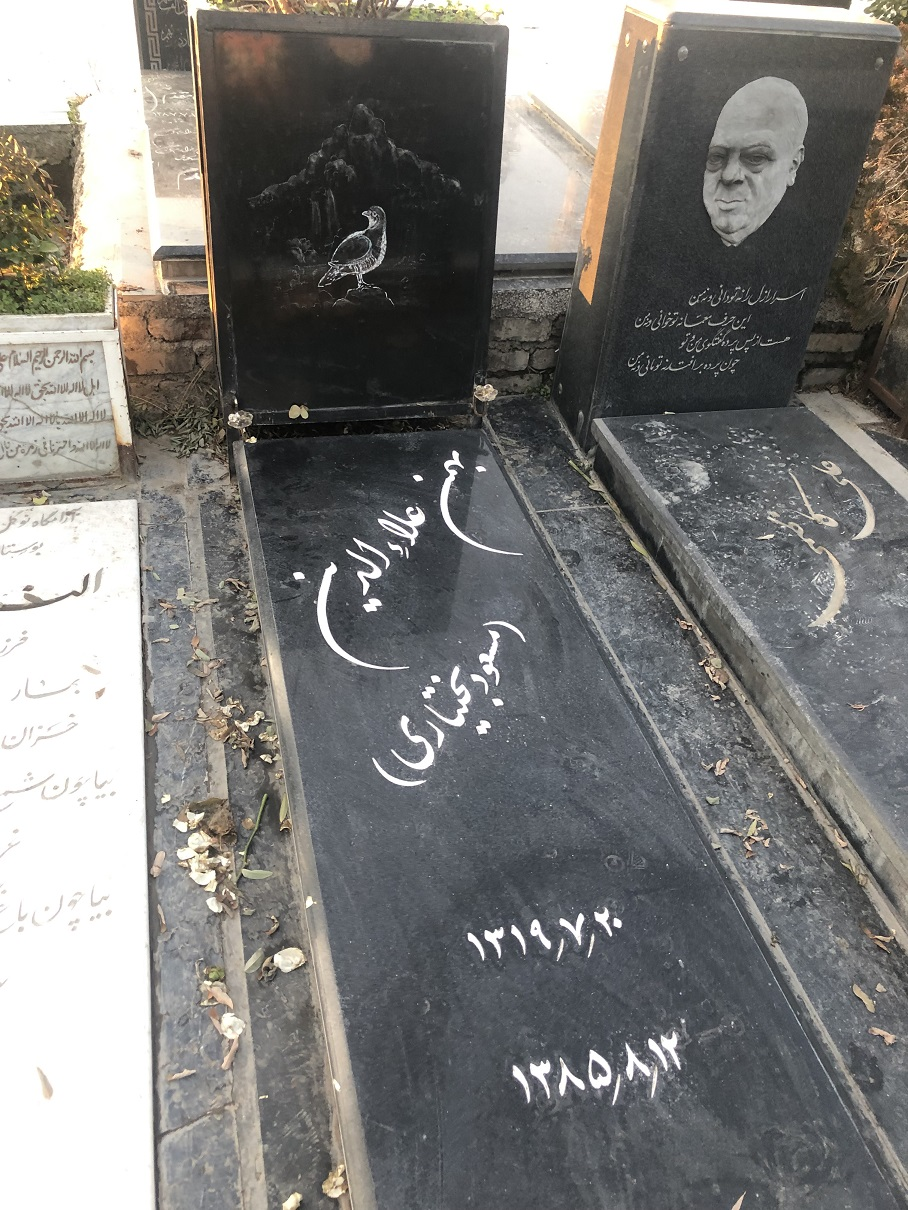
The grave of Masoud Bakhtiari in Karaj

== Discography ==
- 1986: Māl Kanoon (Persian: مال کَنون)
- 1992: Hey Jār (Persian: هِی جار)
- 1994: Tārāz (Persian: تاراز)
- 1996: Bar Afto (Persian: بَراَفتَو)
- 1998: Āstāreh (Persian: آستارَه)
- 2005: Bahig (Persian: بَهیگ)
- 2016: Vir (Persian: ویر)
