= Maziar (singer) =

Iranian singer (1952–1997)

- Born: Abdolreza Kiani Nejad; June 21, 1952; Babol, Mazandaran, Iran
- Died: April 5, 1997 (aged 44) Emamzadeh Taher, Karaj, Iran
- Genres: Persian Pop, Persian Traditional
- Occupations: Singer, songwriter
- Years active: 1953–1997
- Labels: Taraneh Records, Pars Video, Caspian, Pejvak Records

Abdolreza Kiani Nejad (Persian: عبدالرضا کیانی نژاد; June 21, 1952 – April 5, 1997), more commonly known as Maziar (Persian: مازیار), also spelled Mazyar, was a prominent Iranian singer. He died on April 5, 1997, of a heart attack and stroke at the age of 44.

== Discography ==
=== Studio albums ===
Mahigir (Fisherman) 1976 ℗
Name of Song	Lyricist	Composer	Arranger
Mahigir (Fisherman)	Jahanbakhsh Pazooki	Jahanbakhsh Pazooki	Naser Cheshmazar
Zemzemeh (Whisper)	Ghulam-Hosayn Amrani	Mohammad Shams	Mohammad Shams
Khasteh (Tired)	Rahim Moeini Kermanshahi	Emad Ram	Mohammad Shams
Me'raj (Ascension)	Ardalan Sarfaraz	Farid Zoland	Andranik Asaturian
Aziz (My Dear)		Mojtaba Mirzadeh	Mojtaba Mirzadeh
Payeez (Autumn)	Reza Abdullahi	Mohammad Shams	Mohammad Shams
Gharib (Strangeness)			
Kabootar (Pigeon)	Jahanbakhsh Pazooki	Jahanbakhsh Pazooki	Eric Arconte

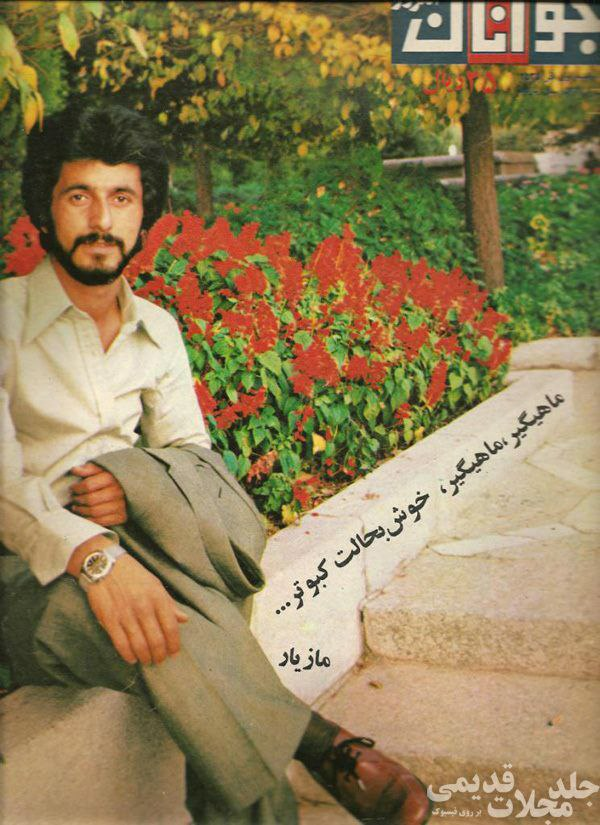
- Maziar on Javanan magazine's cover in 1976, issue 552. A popular Iranian youth magazine of the 1970's.
  A singer, A song Vol. 2 – Persian Music ℗ 1976 Caspian
- Persian Music Hits CD 7 ℗ 1976 Caspian
- Golden Songs No. 8 – Persian Music ℗ 1976 Caspian
- Mahigir – Persian Music ℗ 1978 Caspian
- Harf Bezan ℗ 1985 Taraneh Enterprises Inc
- 50 Songs of 50 Years Vol 1 ℗ 2005 Taraneh Enterprises Inc
- Mahee Gir ℗ 2008 Pars Video
- Ay Iran ℗ 2008 Pars Video
- Asheghaneh No. 1 ℗ 2008 Pars Video
- Old But Gold Vol. 8 ℗ 2008 Pars Video
- Lazehyeh Bidari ℗ 2008 Pars Video
- Khazteh – Ep ℗ 2009 Pars Video
- Red House ℗ 2009 Pars Video
- Love Songs 7 ℗ 2009 Pars Video
- Arezooye Farda
- Zemzemeh
- Tanhaei
- Harf
- Koodake Gharn
- Gole Gandom (1994)

=== Singles ===
- Aziz
- Hamsar (1972)
- Peykareh (1973)
- Harf Bezan (1977)
- Shokate Boodan
- To Ke Nisti
- Saghi (1977)
- Koodake Gharn
- Faryaad
- Kabootar (1976)
- Vatan Ey Aziztarinam
- Gharib
- Sargashteh
- Khasteh
- Iran Iran
- Adat (1976)
- Yousofe Gomgashteh
- Arezooye Farda
- Salar
- Baghche (1977)
- Adam Keh Barfi (1978)

== Filimography ==
1953 Dokhtaran va Pesarane Gol

1954 Cheshm Sefidi

1955 Zaman

1956 Nakhoda

1957 Deltangi

1958 Ghorbate Shahr

1959 Ghorbat

1960 Sakhti

1961 Bargashte Haye Zamane

1962 Delam

1963 Zakhme Bi Marham va Khon

1964 In Hame Sal Ha

1965 Gozashte

1966 Nakhoda Jalal

1967 Nakhodaye Khorshid va Tolou

1968 Gozashtegi

1969 Sargozashte Haye Man

1970 Doktor

1971 Hame Ghadisin

1972 Dokhtare Ziba

1973 All Saints

1974 Gonahkare Badbakht

1975 Dabirestan

1976 Pedaram

1977 Madaram

1978 Pedar va Madar

1979 Delam Sookht

1980 Zamane Jang
