= Emamzadeh Taher =

Imamzadeh and cemetery in Karaji, Iran

Coordinates: 35°49′02″N 50°55′23″E

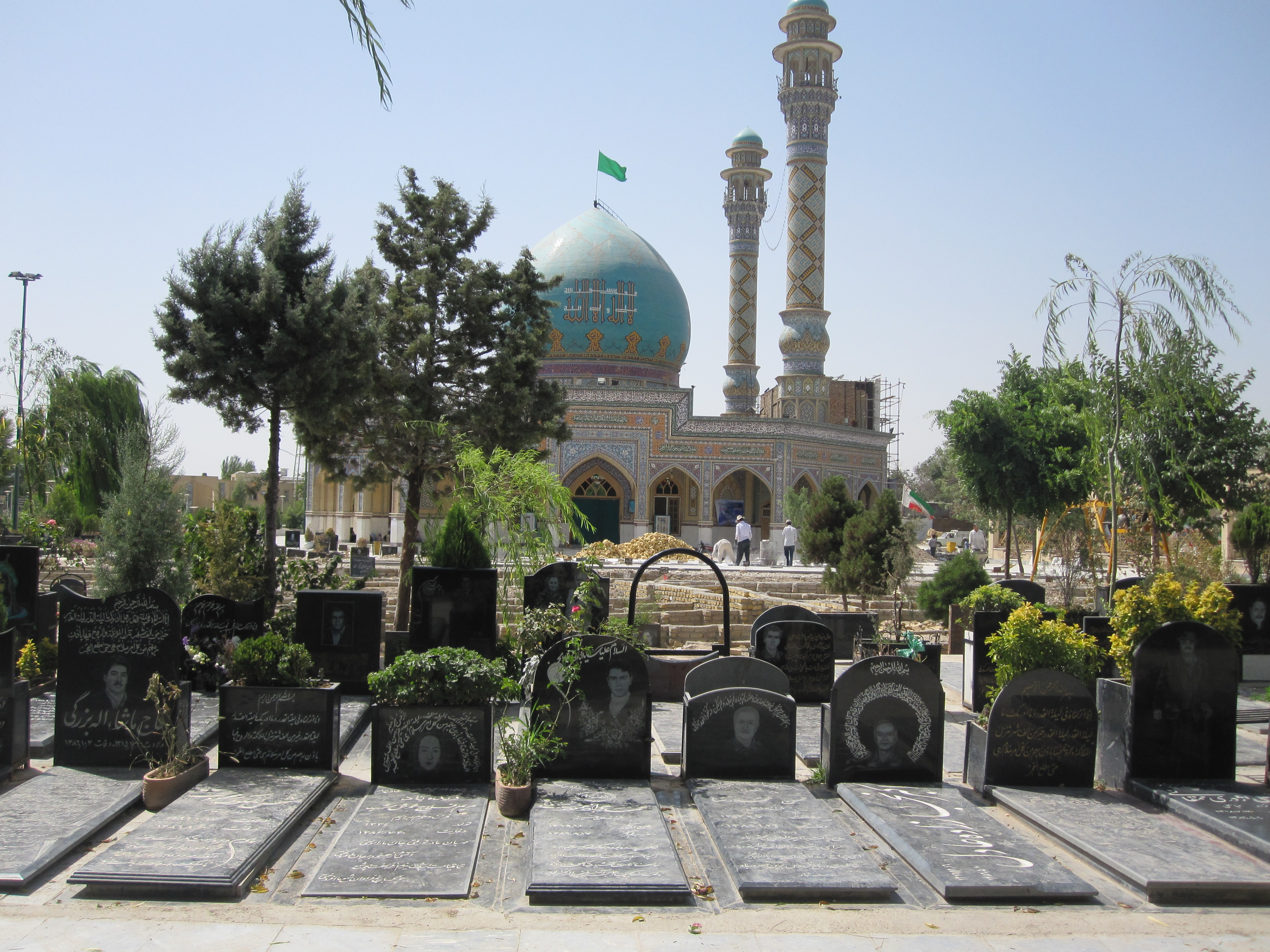

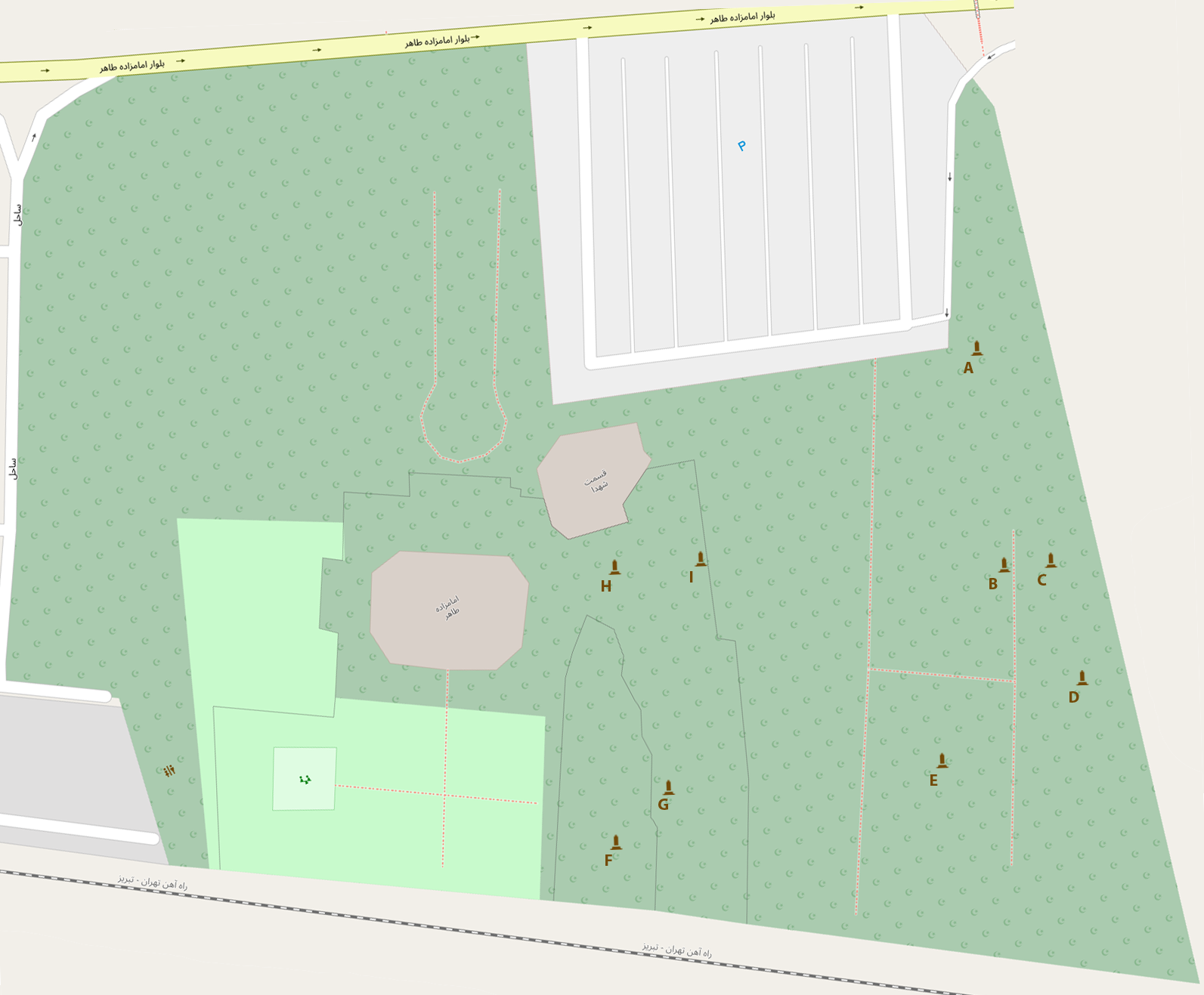
A: Hassan Golnaraqi, Maziar B: Shamlou, Ahmad Mahmoud, Golshiri, Pouyandeh, Mokhtari C: Bahari, Ahmad Ebadi, Habibollah Badei D: Taghi Zohouri, Zand Vakili, Hassan Kamkar E: Jalal Zolfonun F :Delkash G: Hannaneh, Ghavami, Aghasi H: Gholam-Hossein Banan I: Pooran

Emamzadeh Taher (Persian: امامزاده طاهر) is a famous cemetery in Karaj, Iran.

== Notable burials ==
Many prominent figures of Iranian literature, art, and culture are interred here, including:

- Gholam-Hossein Banan (1911–1986) – singer
- Hassan-Ali Daftari (fa) (1910–1988) – musician
- Amir-Nasser Eftetah (de) (1935–1988) – musician
- Abdolali Vaziri (fa) (1907–1989) – singer
- Ezzat Rouhbakhsh (1908–1989) – singer
- Morteza Hannaneh (1923–1989) – composer
- Hossein Qavami (fa) (1909–1990) – singer
- Pouran (1934–1990) – singer
- Manochehr Sheybani (fa) (1924–1991) – poet
- Princess Hamdam al-Saltaneh Pahlavi (1903–1992) – daughter of Reza Shah
- Taghi Zohouri (1913–1992) – actor
- Hossein Ali Mallah (1921–1992) – musician
- Hassan Kamkar (fa) (1923–1992) – musician
- Habibollah Badiee (1933–1992) – musician
- Ali-Asghar Zand Vakili (fa) (1941–1992) – musician
- Ahmad Ebadi (1906–1993) – musician
- Hassan Golnaraqi (fa) (1921–1993) – musician
- Shapour Niakan (fa) (1935–1993) – musician
- Parviz Narenjiha (fa) (1939–1993) – voice actor
- Ali-Asghar Bahari (1905–1995) – musician
- Kazem Rajavi (fa) (1912–1996) – poet
- Ghazaleh Alizadeh (1949–1996) – poet
- Shahin Hannaneh (fa) (1943–1997) – poet
- Maziar (1952–1997) – singer
- Gholamhossein Bigdeli (1919–1998) – writer
- Mohammad Mokhtari (1942–1998) – writer
- Mohammad-Jafar Pouyandeh (1954–1998) – writer
- Ahmad Shamlou (1925–2000) – poet
- Houshang Golshiri (1938–2000) – writer
- Jafar Badiei (fa) (1915–2001) – journalist
- Safar Ghahremani (1921–2002) – political activist
- Ahmad Mahmoud (1931–2002) – writer
- Delkash (1925–2004) – singer
- Shapour Jafroudi (fa) (1928–2004) – folklore singer
- Aladin Pazargadi (fa) (1913–2004) – translator
- Nematollah Aghasi (1939–2005) – popular singer
- Mahmoud Mosharraf Azad Tehrani (M. Azad) (1933–2006) – poet
- Masoud Bakhtiari (1940–2006) – folklore singer
- Iraj Soleimani (1946–2009) – football player
- Babak Masoumi (1972–2011) – futsal player and coach
- Jalal Zolfonun (1938–2012) – musician
- Yahya Mafi (fa) (1923–2013) – writer
- Hamid-Reza Kamali (fa) (d. 2015) – racing driver
- Houshang Chalangi (fa) (1941–2021) – poet
- Nasser Taghvai (1941–2025) – film director
