= Marzieh (singer) =

Iranian musical artist (1924–2010)

Marzieh مرضیه
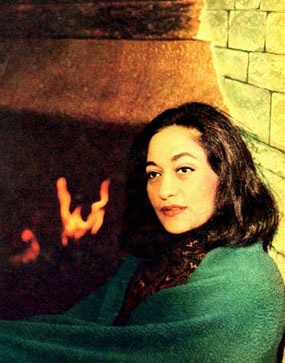

Background information
- Also known as: Marzieh
- Born: Khadijeh Ashraf o-Sadat Mortezaie; 22 March 1924; Tehran, Persia
- Died: 13 October 2010 (aged 86) Paris, France
- Genres: Classical; Folk; Traditional
- Occupation: Singer
- Years active: 1942–1979; 1991–2010
- Labels: Ahange Rooz, Apolon, Caltex Records; Pars Video; Avang Records

Khadijeh Ashraf o-Sadat Mortezaie (Persian: خدیجه اشرف‌السادات مرتضایی; 22 March 1924 – 13 October 2010), better known as Marzieh (مرضیه), was an Iranian singer of Persian traditional music.

== Career ==
Marzieh started her career in the 1940s at Radio Tehran and cooperated with some of the greatest 20th century Persian songwriters and lyricists like Ali Tajvidi, Parviz Yahaghi, Homayoun Khorram, Rahim Moeini Kermanshahi and Bijan Taraghi. Marzieh also sang with the Farabi Orchestre, conducted by Morteza Hannaneh, a pioneer of Persian polyphonic music, during the 1960s and 1970s. Her first major public performance was in 1942, when, though still a teenager, she played the principal role of Shirin at the Jame'eh Barbod [Barbod Society] opera house in the Persian operetta Shirin and Farhad.

Following the Islamic Revolution of 1979 public performances and broadcasts of record albums by solo female singers were banned outright for ten years. Ayatollah Khomeini had decreed: "Women's voices should not be heard by men other than members of their own families."

She told the Daily Telegraph that to continue her vocal practice she used to walk by night from her home in the historic north-Tehran Niavaran foothills to her cabin in the mountains, where she would sing next to a roaring waterfall: "Nobody could hear me. I sang to the stars and the rocks."

Upon the death of Khomeini the succeeding leaders suggested that she could resume singing, provided that she undertook never to sing for men. She refused, declaring, "I have always sung only for all Iranians".

=== Exile ===
In 1994, Marzieh left Iran forever due to the political repression, making her new home in Paris.

She performed several concerts in Los Angeles, California and Royal Albert Hall (London) in 1993, 1994 and 1995. The Paris-based composer Mohammad Shams and the Persian tar soloist Hamid Reza Taherzadeh were the main musicians who worked with Marzieh in exile. Marzieh's last concert was performed at Olympia in 2006.

The European press have also compared her to Vanessa Redgrave and Melina Mercouri for her willingness to put political and human-rights beliefs ahead of her career, and even ahead of her own safety.

== Death ==
Marzieh died of cancer in Paris on 13 October 2010, aged 86. Her death was announced on the website of the National Council of Resistance of Iran, of which she was a member, and Maryam Rajavi, co-leader of the People's Mujahedin of Iran, delivered her eulogy.

== See also ==
- List of Iranian women musicians
