= Ezzat Rouhbakhsh =

Iranian singer (1908–1989)

- عزت روح‌بخش
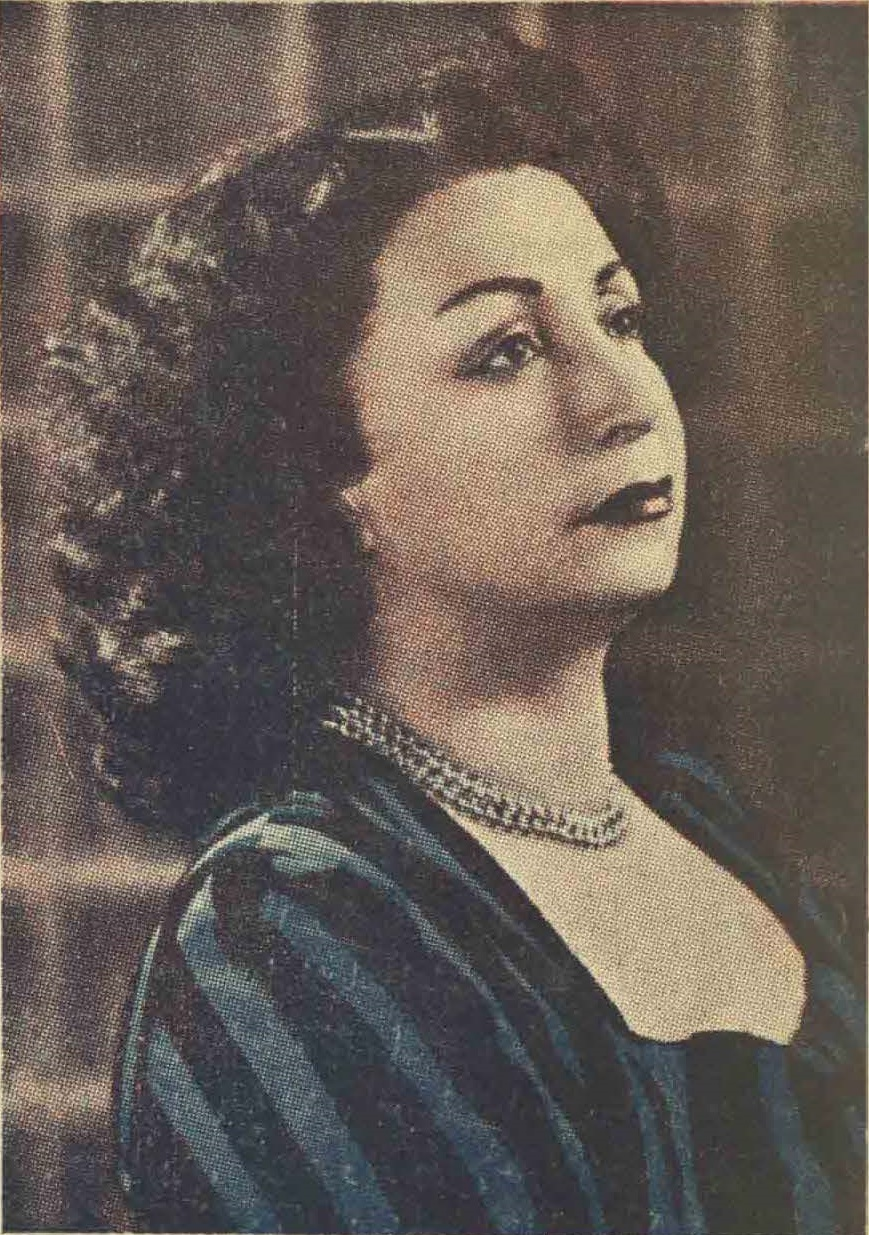
- Rouhbakhsh in June 1952
- Born: 1908; Ashtian, Markazi province, Qajar Iran (now Iran)
- Died: 1989 (aged 80–81); Iran
- Burial place: Emamzadeh Taher, Karaj, Iran
- Other names: Ezzat Ruhbakhsh
- Occupation: Singer
- Known for: Persian traditional music

Ezzat Rouhbakhsh (1908–1989; Persian: عزت روح‌بخش, lit. 'soulful honor'), was an Iranian singer. She was known for her radio performances of Persian traditional music.

== Biography ==
Ezzat Rouhbakhsh was born in 1908, in the city of Ashtian in Markazi province, Qajar Iran (now Iran).

At the age of sixteen, she entered the field by performing in the play Khosro and Shirin, and the operetta Dokhtark. She was a music student of Ali Khan Naib-ul-Sultaneh. She continued her singing studies under Ali-Akbar Shahnazi, Shabpereh, Suleiman Rohafza, and Abolhasan Saba.

Rouhbakhsh started her radio performances with Hossein Tehrani, and worked in radio for many years. She performed alongside other female singers of the era, including Marzieh, Pooran, and Elaha. The noted Iranian folk song, "Primrose Flower" (Persian: گل پامچال, romanized: Gol Chalchal), originally a Gilaki song, was first recorded by Rouhbakhsh around 1976. She also worked with the Loyal Brothers Orchestra (Persian: ارکستر برادران وفادار) for many years.

She died in 1989, and was buried in Emamzadeh Taher in Karaj, Iran.
