= Habibollah Badiee =

Iranian musician, composer (1933–1992)

- حبیب‌الله بدیعی
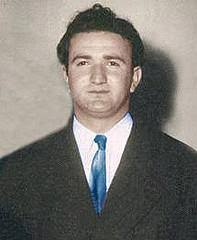
- Habibollah Badiee in the 1960s
- Born: 4 April 1933; Azan Deh, Savadkuh County, Mazandaran province, Imperial State of Persia (now Iran)
- Died: 19 October 1992 (aged 59)
- Burial place: Emamzadeh Taher
- Other names: Habibullah Badiee, Habibullah Badii, Habibullah Badiei
- Occupations: Musician, composer, educator, singer
- Known for: Violin

Habibollah Badiee (Persian: حبیب‌الله بدیعی; 4 April 1933 – 19 October 1992) was an Iranian musician, singer, and composer. He was known for combining Western-style classical violin and Iranian symphonic music. Badiee was considered one of the masters of his generation of Iranian music.

== Biography ==
Habibollah Badiee was born on 4 April 1933, in the Azan Deh village in Savadkuh County, Mazandaran province, Imperial State of Iran. At age 8, his family moved to Tehran. At the age of 17, he started working for Golha radio station, where he was a soloist.

Badiee composed more than 200 songs, some were for other musical artists, and many of which are considered classics.

In 1964, he became a member of the Radio Music Council, and in 1966, he became the deputy director of Radio Tehran and then the deputy director of music department. From 1967 to 1972, he was appointed the head of the Iran Radio Music Department; and from 1972 to 1979, he was appointed as a member of the Council of the Music Unit, whose members consisted of: Morteza Hannaneh, Ali Tajvidi, and Hossein Ali Mallah. He was the leader of the Barbad Orchestra for six years.

Badiee died of heart disease on 19 October 1992, at Tos Hospital in Tehran. He is buried at Emamzadeh Taher cemetery in Karaj.
