= Susan (Iranian singer) =

Susan سوسن
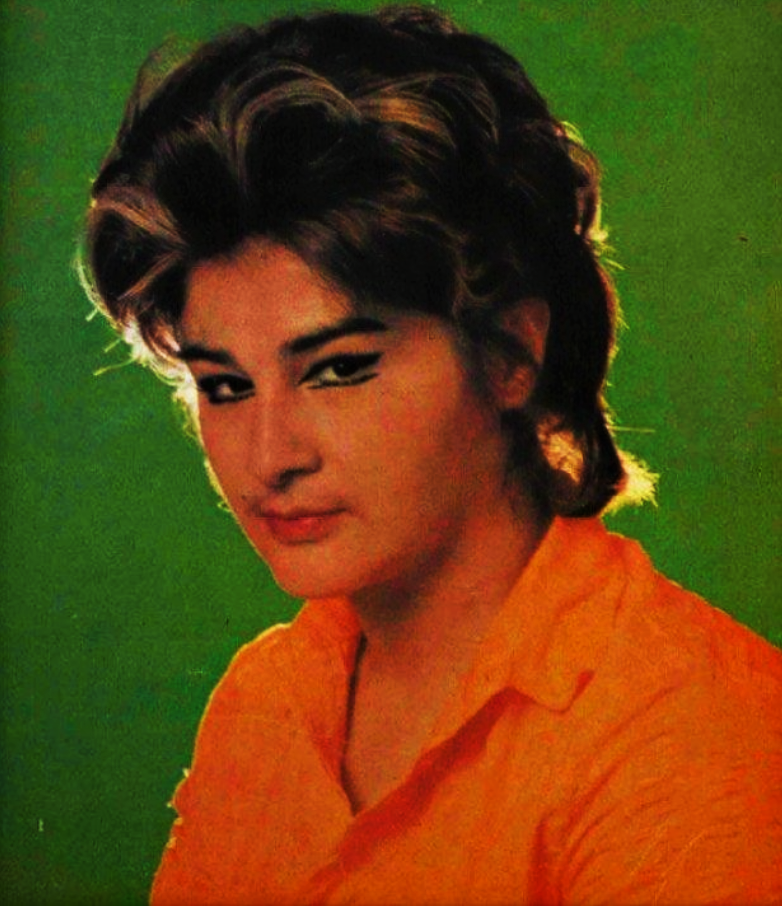

Background information
- Also known as: Soosan, Sousan
- Born: Golandam Taherkhani; 12 June 1943; Qasr-e Shirin, Iran
- Died: 3 May 2004 (aged 60) Los Angeles, California, U.S.
- Occupation: Singer
- Years active: 1960s–2004

Golandam Taherkhani (Persian: گل‌اندام طاهرخانی; June 12, 1943 – May 3, 2004), known professionally as Susan (also Sousan or Soosan; Persian: سوسن), was a popular Iranian singer of particularly the 1960s and 1970s. Among her recordings was her 1969 release of "Kolah Makhmali" ("felt hat").

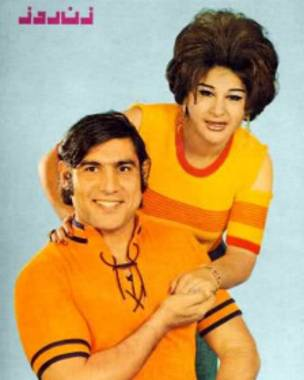
Susan and Nematollah Aghasi on the cover on Zan-e Rooz magazine, 1970s

== Early life ==
Golandam Taherkhani was born in Qasr-e Shirin in 1943. Her father's name was Ibrahim and her mother's name was Bilqis. Her family was Kurdish. After the death of her father in an accident, she moved to the city of Takestan with her mother, settled there for a while and later moved to Tehran. After her mother died of cholera, Taherkhani lived with her aunt. In their neighborhood, there was a woman who used to sing at the door and sometimes took Taherkhani with her to a local cafe. She started performing there for two tomans a night.

== Entering the field of singing ==
Taherkhani imitated the charming songs of Qamar-ol-Moluk Vaziri and Moluk Zarabi, working under the name of Victor in a cafe for fifteen tomans a night. After some time, she met Rashid Moradi, the music composer of Kuche Bazari. He took her to another cafe and chose the stage name Susan. Susan could not read or write, but she memorized the songs with the help of Moradi and Mohammad Tehrani. After many years, she worked in more luxurious cafes. Reza Soheila owned several cafes in Laleh-Zar Street. He proposed to her, but she refused. As time went by, she was introduced to the radio, invited to big parties and also entered the court by Puran. With Moluk Zarabi, she attended parties of Tadj ol-Molouk, mother of Mohammad Reza Pahlavi.

Susan's most famous song is "Dost Darem Meidooni" which was composed by Fethullah Riahi with lyrics by Saeed Dabiri. She performed songs from several films before the revolution including Qeysar (1969) and Hasan Kachal (Hassan, the Bald) (1970).

== After the 1979 revolution ==
Susan sang in cabarets. After some time, she became a roommate of the singer Mohammad Tehrani, who was performing at Rohudzi Theater. As a result of her arrest at two parties, she endured 74 lashes twice and decided not to sing anymore. After a few months, with help, she immigrated to Turkey, then London, then the United States.

== Hospital construction ==
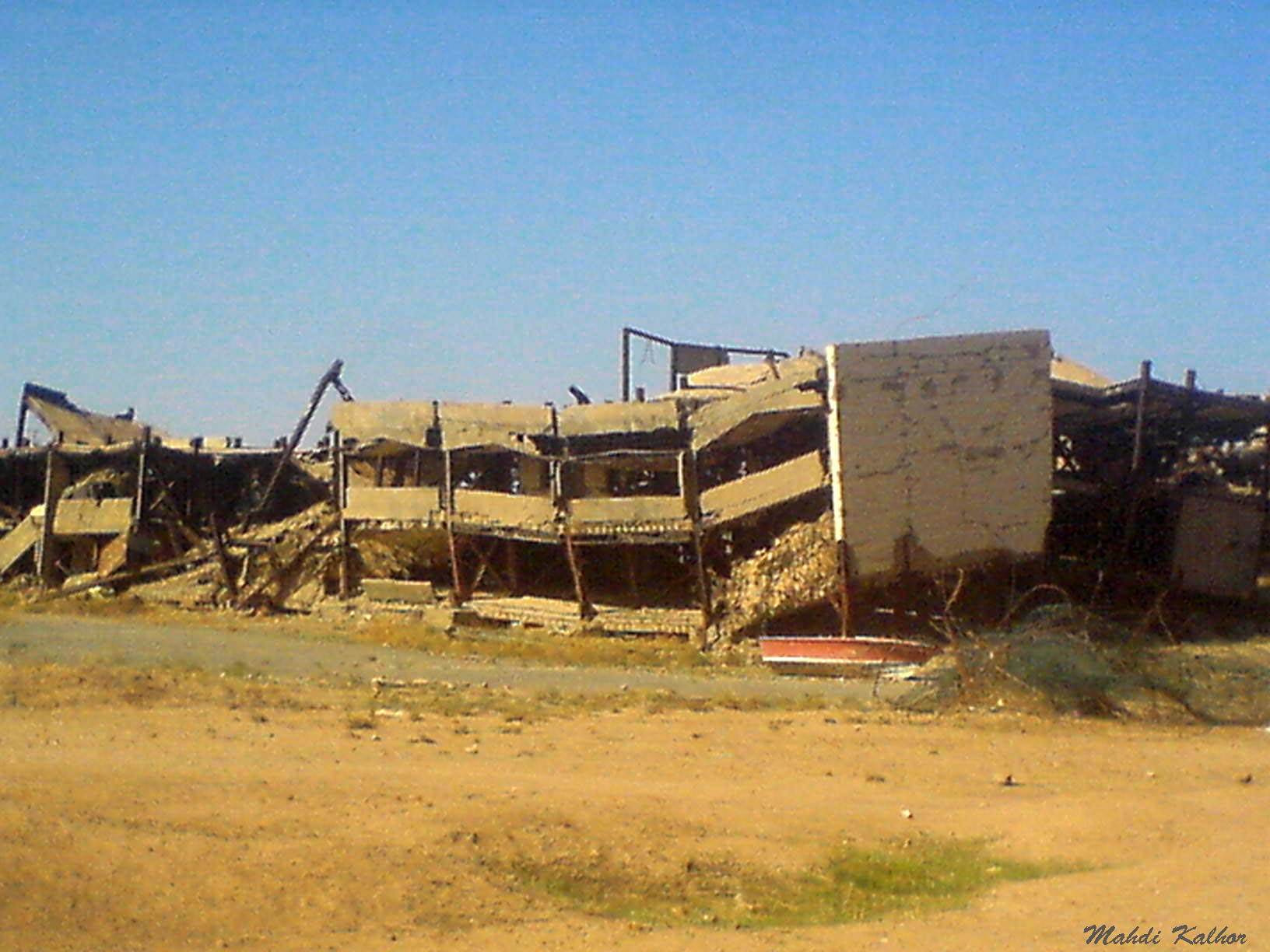
Bimarestan-e Susan (Susan's Hospital) after being destroyed in Iran–Iraq War

A hospital was built in Qasr-e Shirin with her help and financial support. The local people knew the hospital as Bimarestan-e Susan (Susan's Hospital). When this 3-story, 144-bed hospital was about to be opened, the Iran–Iraq War began. Following the capture of Qasr-e Shirin by Ba'athist Iraq, the hospital was occupied until the beginning of 1983. The Iraqis destroyed the hospital before retreating. The area of this building was about four thousand meters. The first floor was completely destroyed and many parts of the other two floors were destroyed. The hospital has not been reconstructed and is visited as a ruin left over from the Iran–Iraq War.

== Final years and death ==
At the end of her life, Susan spent her life in poverty and hardship and complained that others did not find out about her.

On May 3, 2004, Susan died of cardiac arrest in a hospital in Los Angeles, USA, at the age of 60, following surgery on her long-broken right arm. She was buried in one of the American cemeteries far from her homeland.
