= Azar Azima =

Iranian singer (1927–2026)

Azar Azima (Persian: آذر عظیما; December 11, 1927 – June 23, 2026) was an Iranian singer.

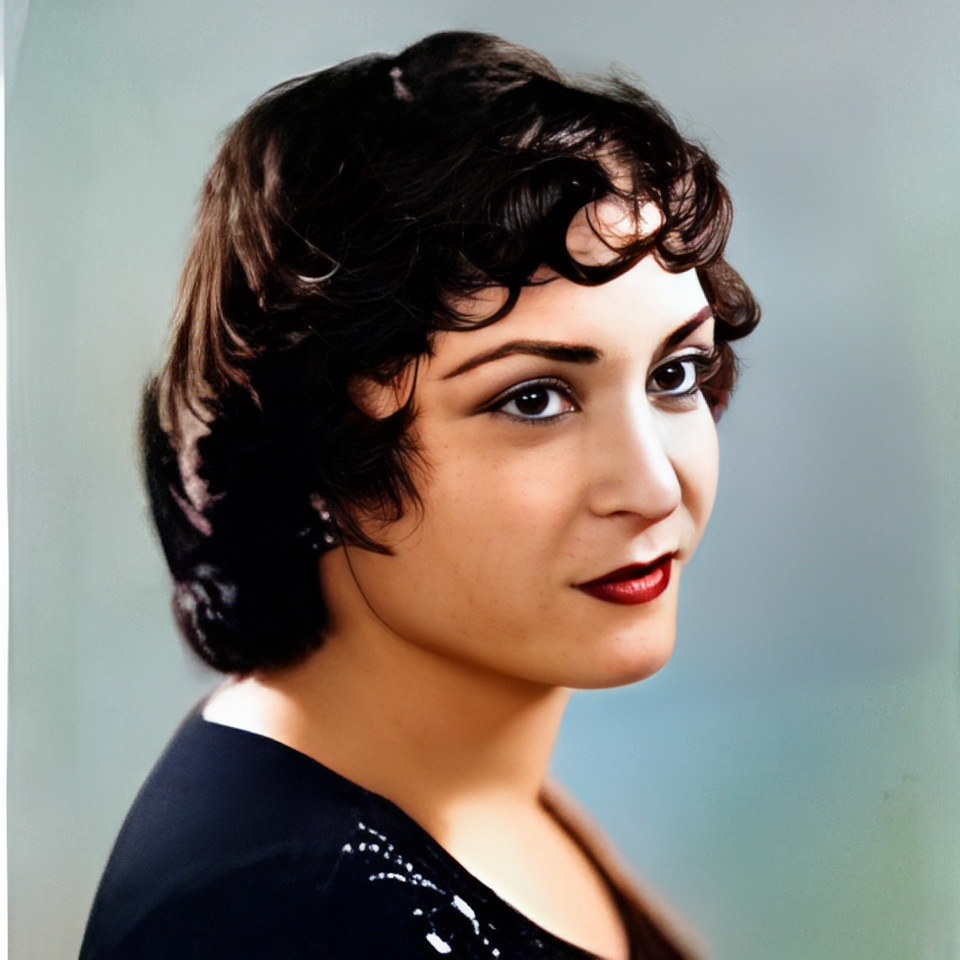
Azar Azima

== Life and career ==
Azima was born in Isfahan on December 11, 1927. She began her collaboration with the radio in 1955. Her first song was a composition by Abolhassan Saba with a poem by Abolhassan Varzi. She was one of the first singers featured on the Golha radio program.

She performed her song Rah Shiraz with the Farabi Orchestra, led by her husband Morteza Hananeh.

Azima died on June 23, 2026, at the age of 98.
