= Pouran (singer) =

Iranian singer and actress

Pouran پوران
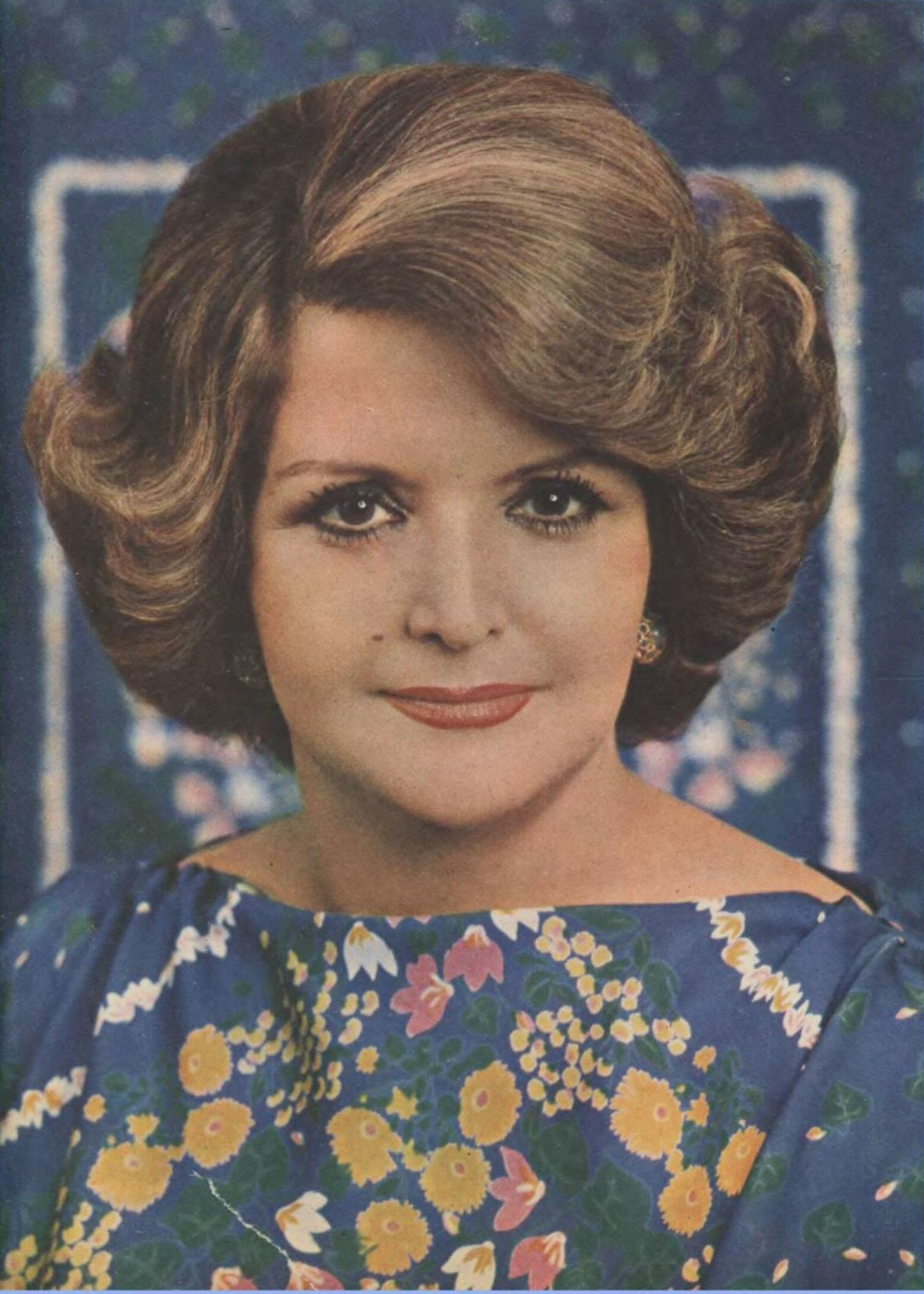

Background information
- Also known as: Pouran, Banu-ye Nashenas, Banu-ye Shapouri
- Born: Farahdokht Abbas Khaghani; February 4, 1934; Tehran, Imperial State of Iran
- Died: October 1, 1990 (aged 56) Khatam-al Anbiya Hospital, Tehran, Iran
- Genres: Persian traditional music; Iranian pop music
- Occupations: Singer; actress
- Years active: 1952–1990

Farahdokht Abbas Khaghani (Persian: فرح‌دخت عباس خاقانی; 4 February 1934 – 4 October 1990), known by the stage name Pouran (پوران), was a pre-revolutionary Iranian pop and classical singer.

== Albums ==
=== Molla Mammad Jaan ===
Title	Songwriter	Composer
Mola Mammad Jaan	Afghan local song	Anoushiravan Rohani
Emroozo Farda	Shahin Hananeh	Naser Cheshmazar
Rasti Cheh Zood Migzareh	Jahanbakhsh Pazooki	Jahanbakhsh Pazooki
Viroon Beshi Ey Del	Jahanbakhsh Pazooki	Jahanbakhsh Pazooki
Sobh Misheh Shab Misheh	Esmail Navab Safa	Anoushiravan Rohani
Ageh Misheh Bargard	Esmail Navab Safa	Anoushiravan Rohani
Haliteh	Homa MirAfshar	Asadollah Malek
Vah Cheh Ballaee Ey Del	Jahanbakhsh Pazooki	Jahanbakhsh Pazooki
Zendegi Ay Zendegi	Jahanbakhsh Pazooki	Jahanbakhsh Pazooki
Migardam Dore Donya	Ardalan Sarfaraz	Parviz Ghiassian
Asheghi Bad Dardieh	Ardalan Sarfaraz	Parviz Ghiassian

=== Ashkam Dooneh Dooneh ===
Title	Songwriter	Composer
Ashkam Dooneh Dooneh	Jahanbakhsh Pazooki	Jahanbakhsh Pazooki
Goli Jaan	Shahabi	Abbas Shapoori
Shaneh	Nasser Rastegar-Nejad	Taken from the song "Al Bint El Shalabiya" by Fairuz
Niloofar	Esmail Navab Safa	Majid Vafadar
Shokoufeha	Jahanbakhsh Pazooki	Jahanbakhsh Pazooki
Fereshteh Man	Jahanbakhsh Pazooki	Jahanbakhsh Pazooki
Ahoo	Karim Fakour	Anoushiravan Rohani
Gol Umad Bahar Umad	Bijan Taraghi	Majid Vafadar
Shab Khosh Bood	Abdollah Fatemi	Abbas Shapoori
Shabhaye Entezar	Abdollah Fatemi	Abbas Shapoori
Ghoroore Shekasteh	Iraj Teymourtash	Majid Vafadar
Cheshmeh	Karim Fakour	Abbas Shapoori

=== Gol Omad Bahar Omad ===
Title	Songwriter	Composer
Gol Omad Bahar Omad	Bijan Taraghi	Majid Vafadar
Shabe Royaee	Bijan Taraghi	Habibollah Badiei
Fetneh	Karim Fakour	Parviz Yahaghi
Safari Dar Shab	Nezam Fatemi	Majid Vafadar
Eshgh o Faramooshi	Bijan Taraghi	
Hadise Ashenaie	Bijan Taraghi	Habibollah Badiei
Shab Miyay (with Manouchehr Sakhaei)	Karim Fakour	
Naghmehe Farvardin		
Gardeshe Sahra	Hedayatollah Nir-Sina	Majid Vafadar
Saze Man	Hedayatollah Nir-Sina	Abbas Shapoori

== See also ==
- Music of Iran
- Persian women musicians
- Persian pop music
