= Azan Deh =

Azan Deh ازان ده
- Village
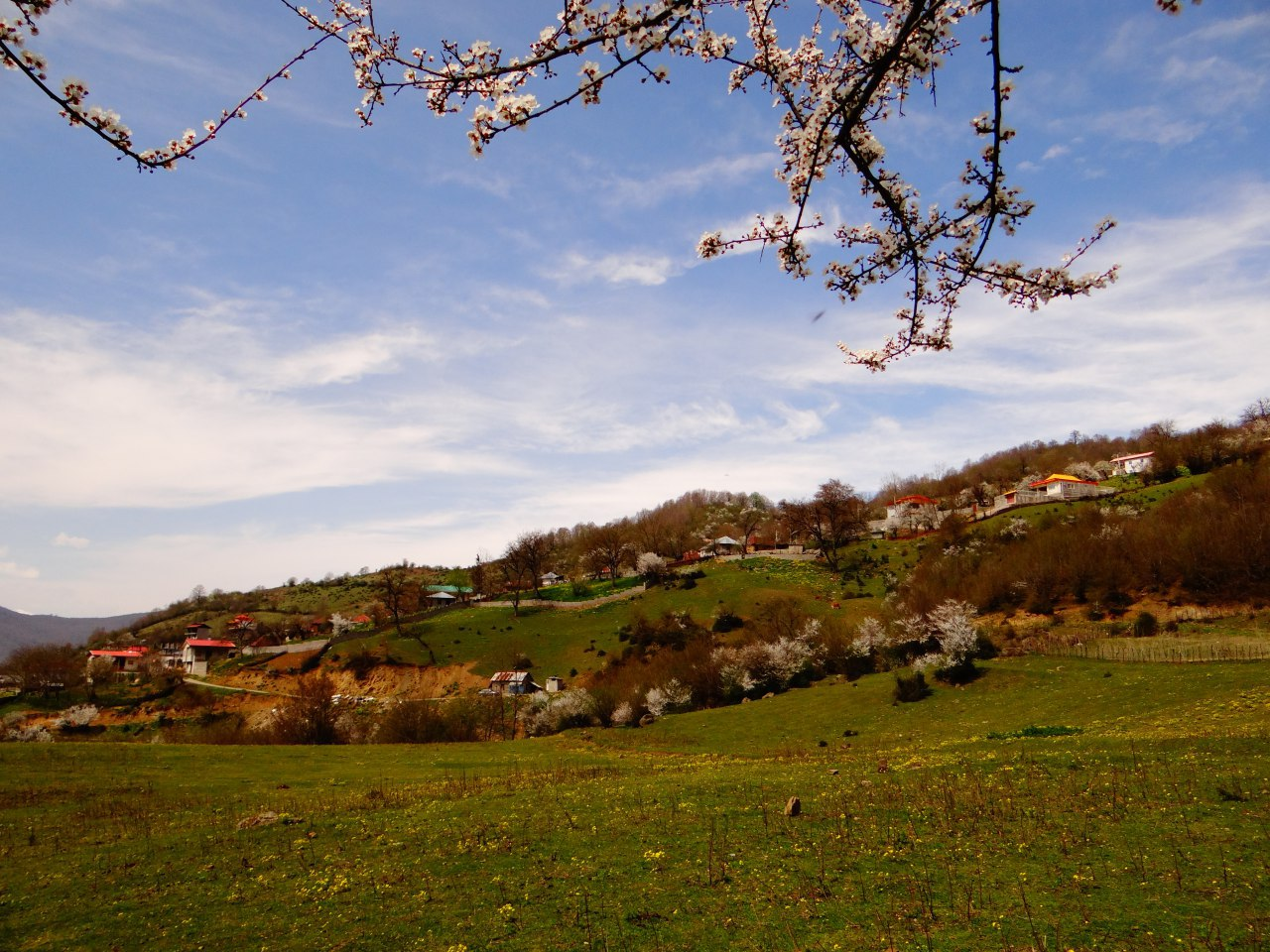
- Azan Deh tourist area

- Location within Iran
- Coordinates: 36°06′38″N 53°05′01″E
- Country: Iran
- Province: Mazandaran
- County: Savadkuh
- Bakhsh: Central
- Rural District: Rastupey

Population (2016)
  - Total: 147
- Time zone: UTC+3:30 (IRST)
- Website: Azandeh.ir

Azan Deh (Persian: ازان ده, also Romanized as Azān Deh) is a village in Rastupey Rural District, in the Central District of Savadkuh County, Mazandaran province, Iran. At the 2016 census, its population was 147, in 53 families, up from 115 people in 2006.

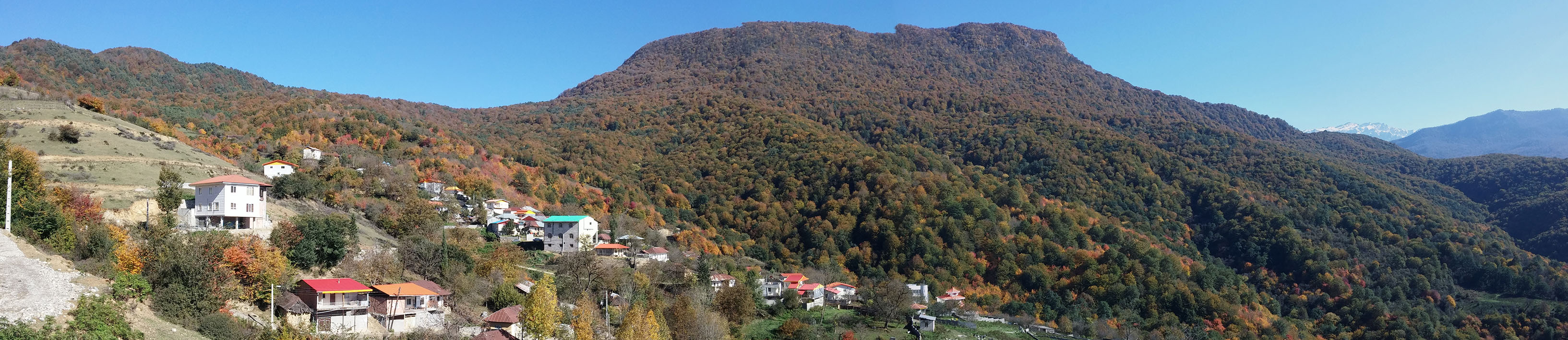
Panoramic images of Azan Deh village

== Gallery ==
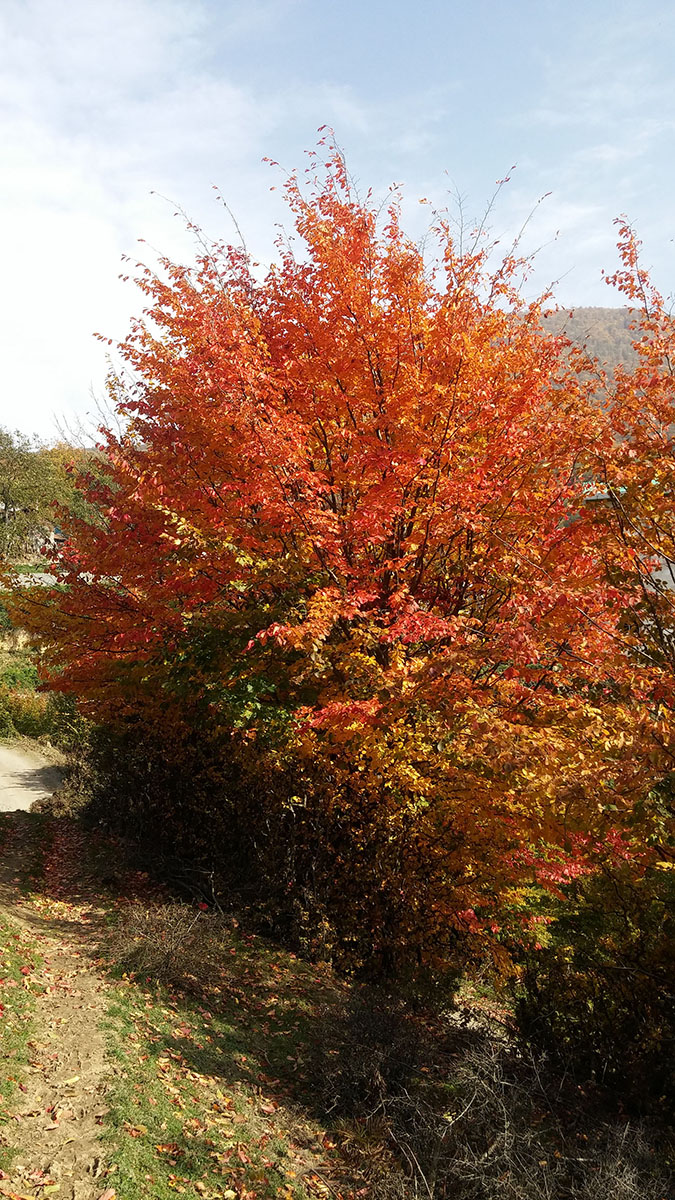
Azan Deh tourist area

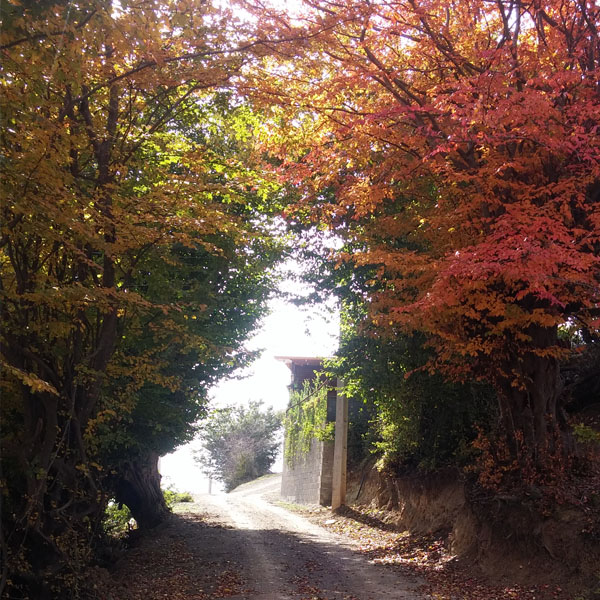
Azan Deh tourist area

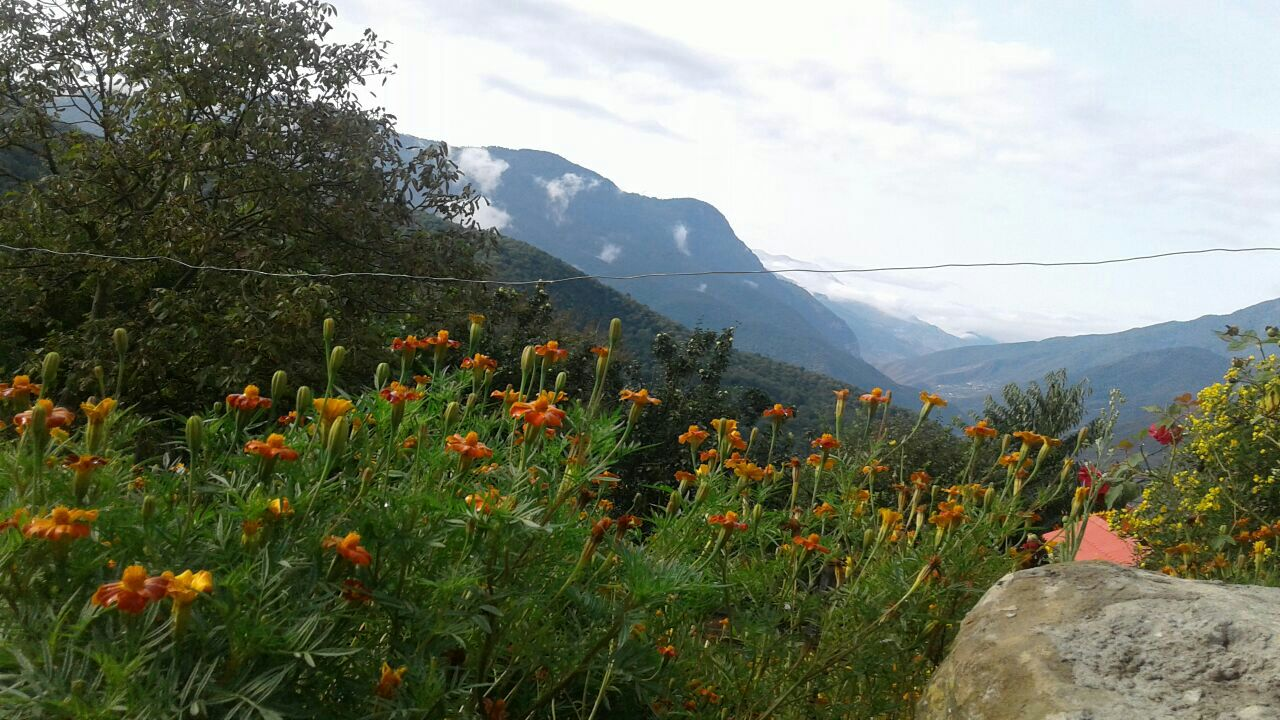
Azan Deh tourist area

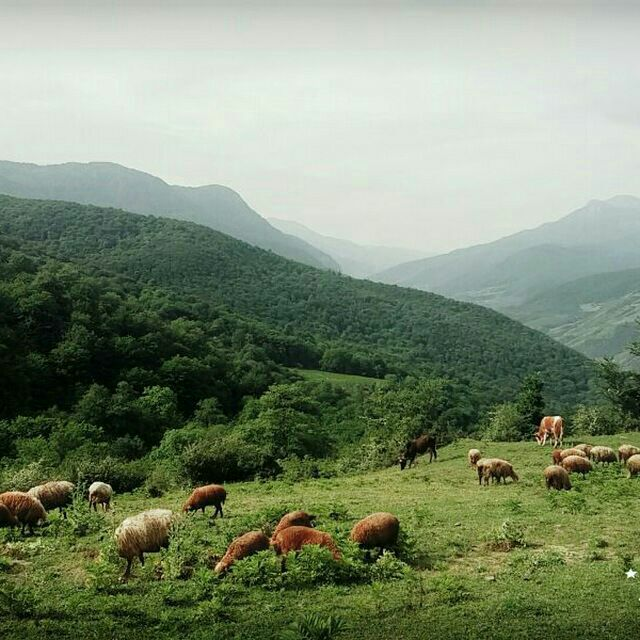
Azan Deh tourist area

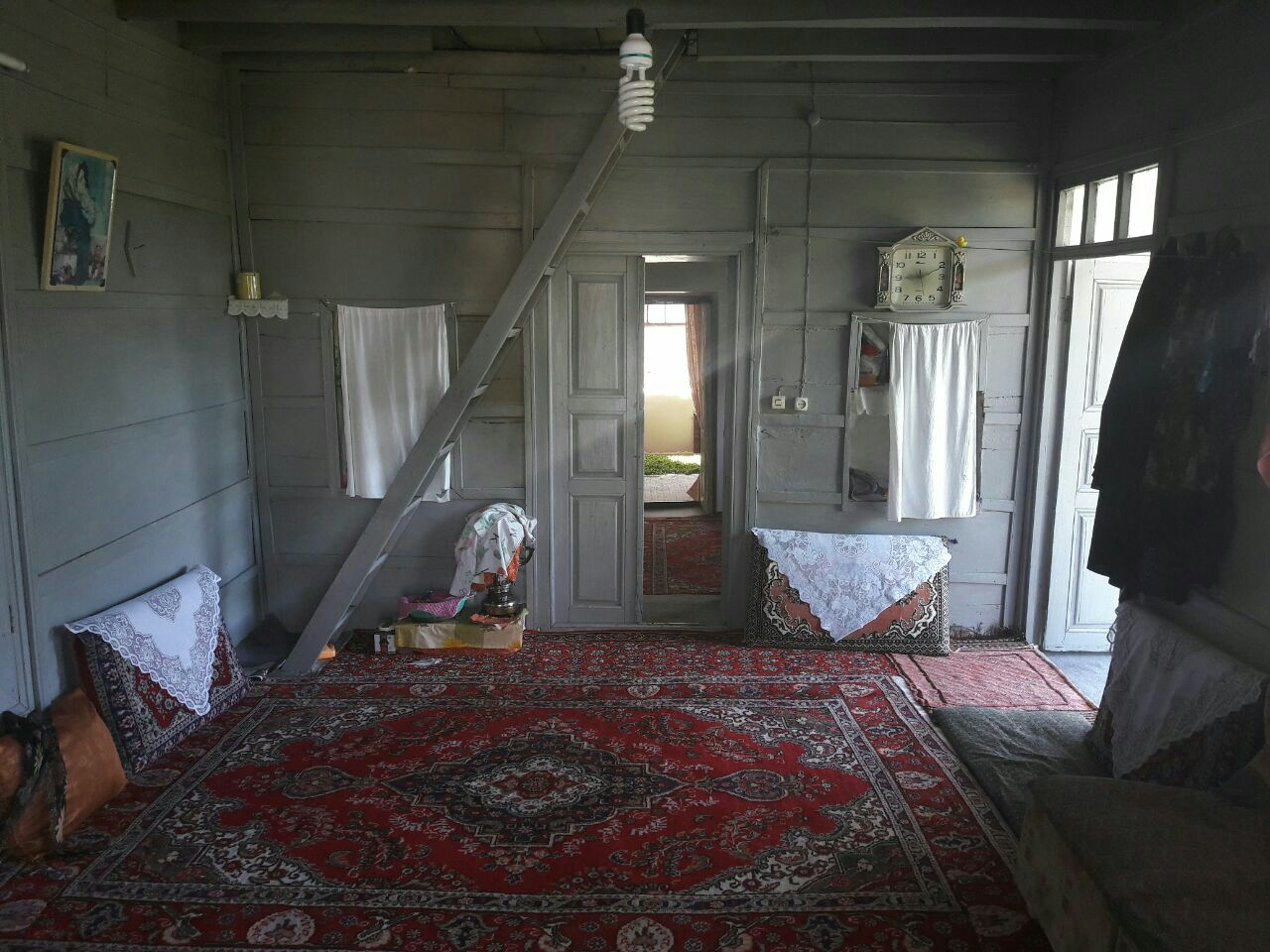
Habib Alah Badiee House

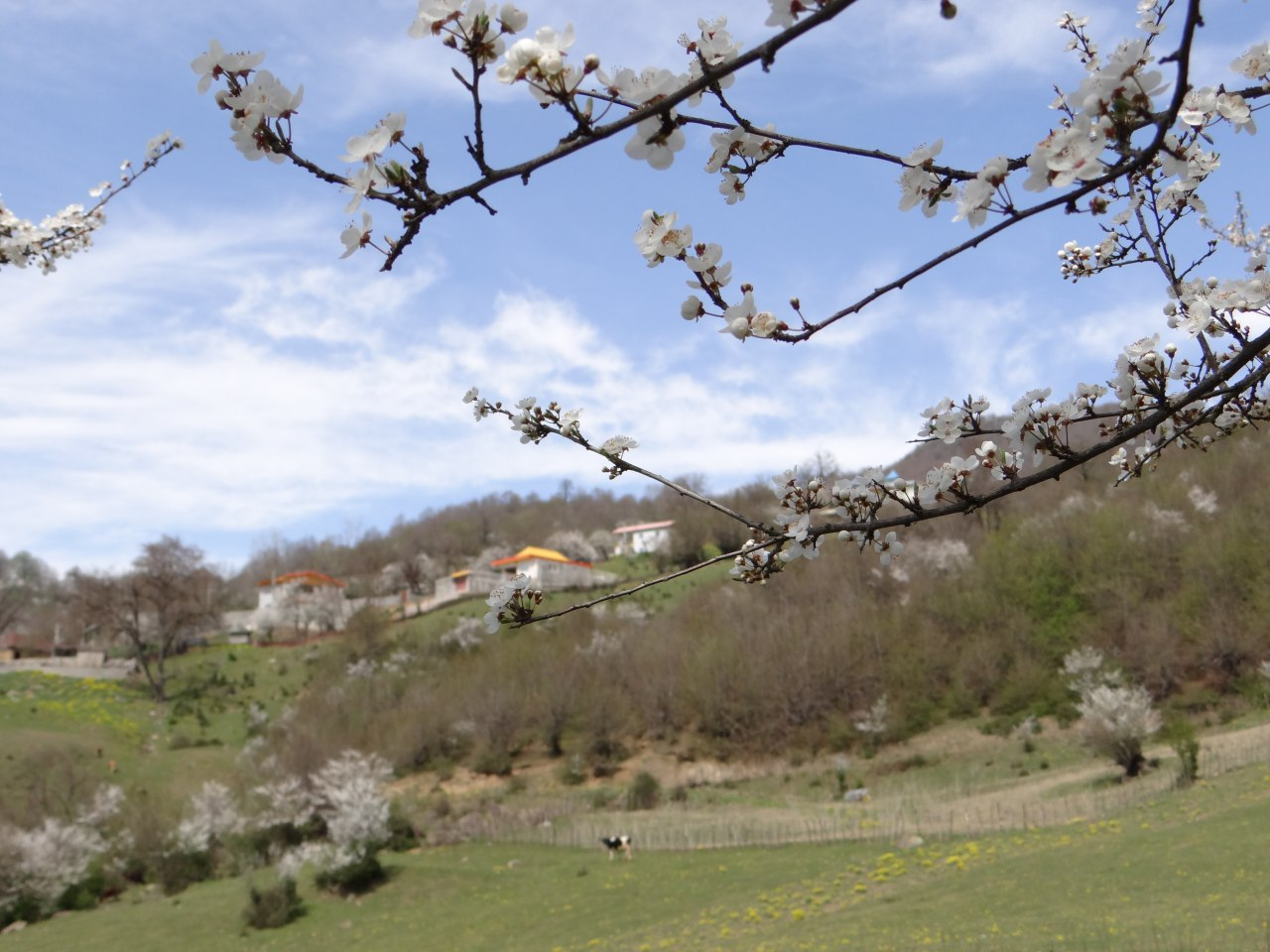
Azan Deh tourist area

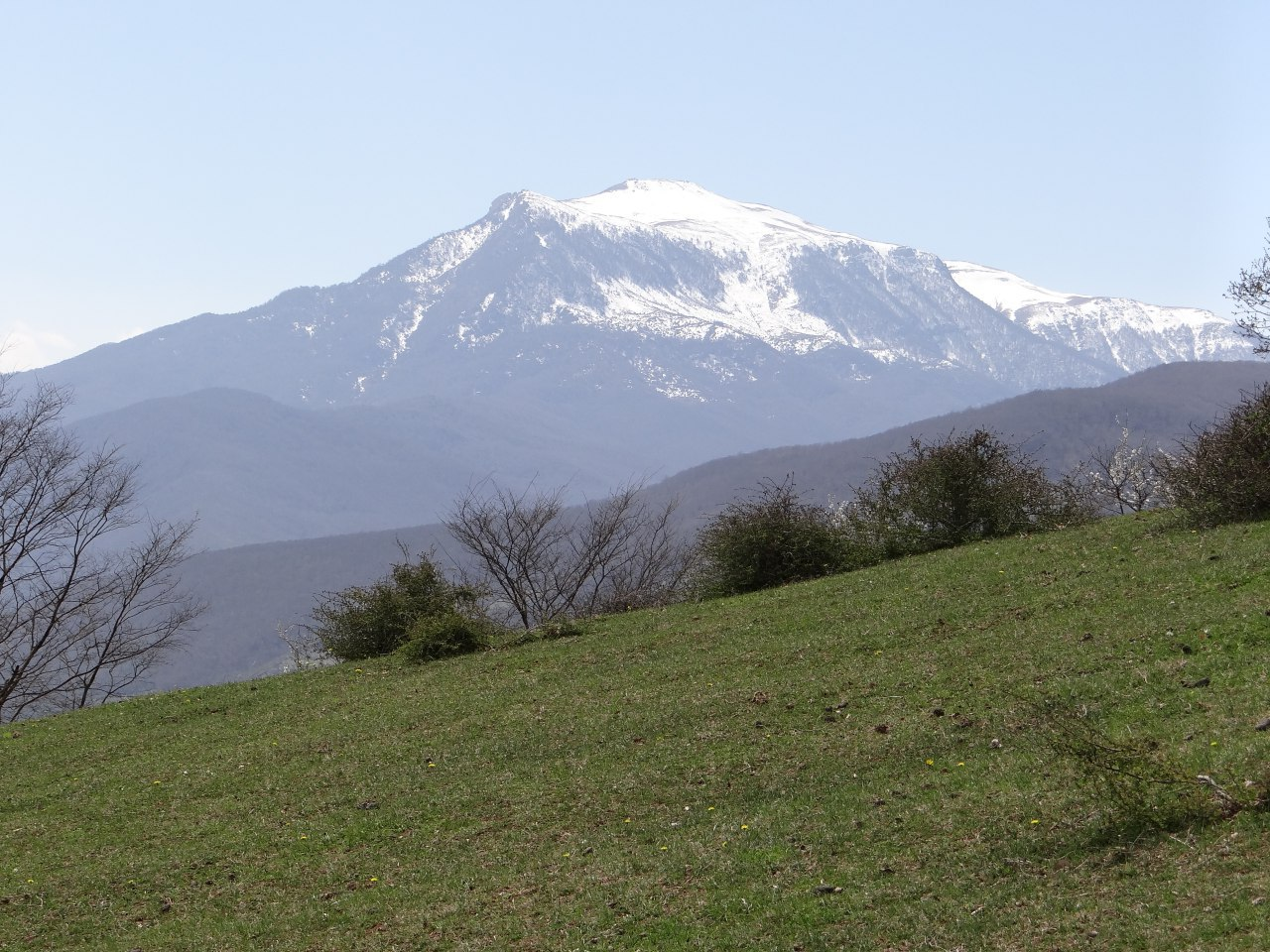
Azan Deh tourist area

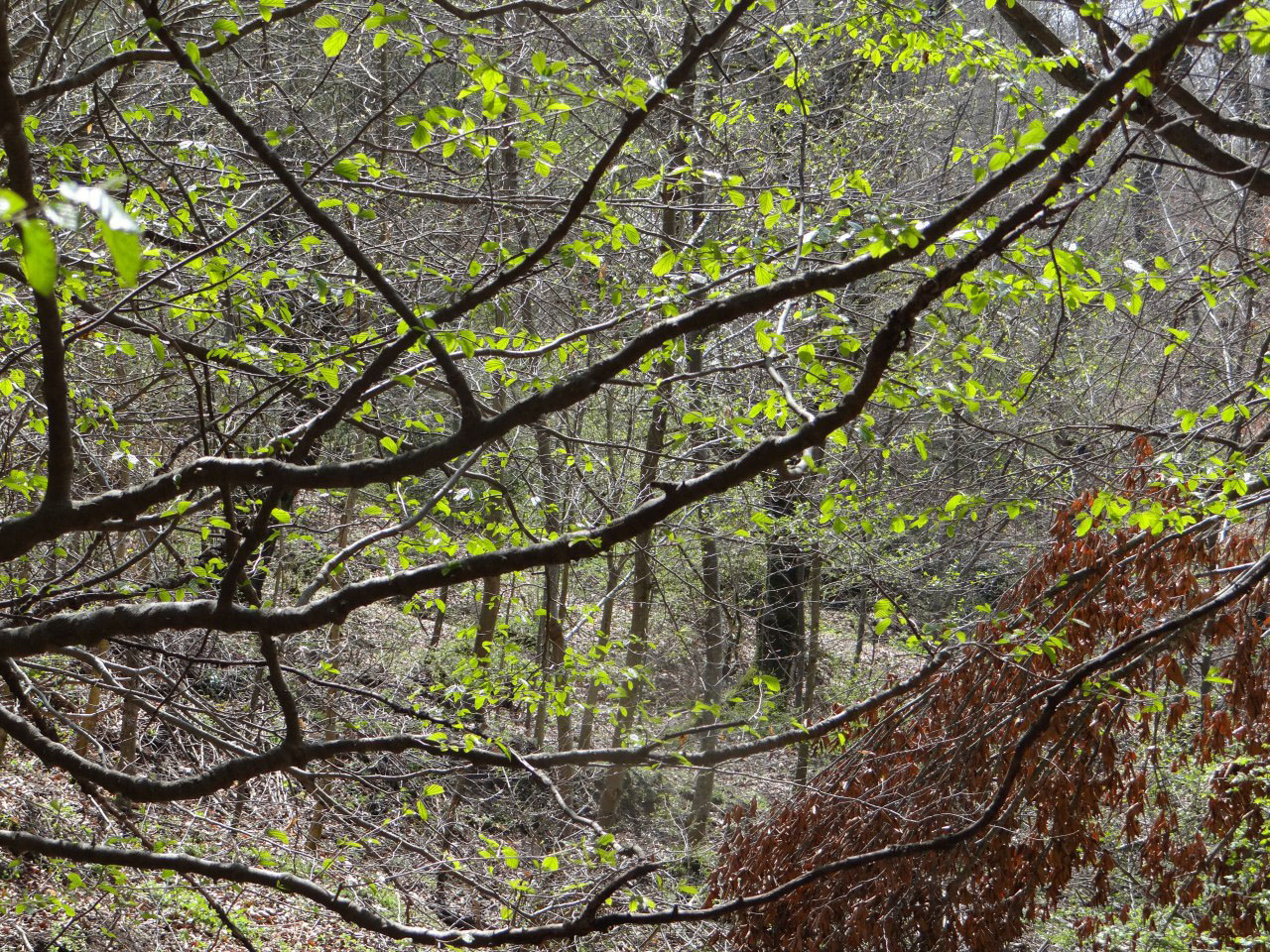
Azan Deh tourist area

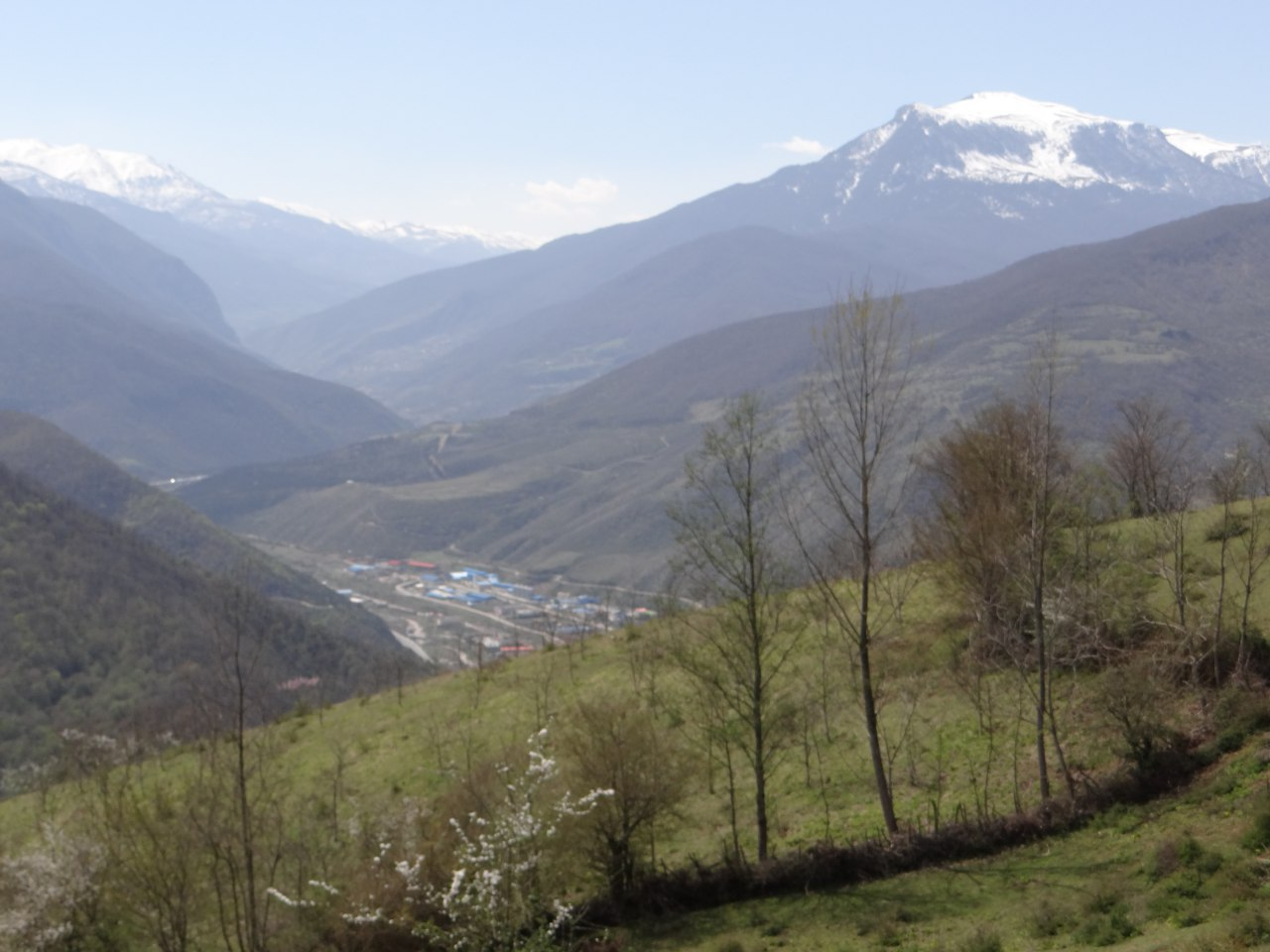
Azan Deh tourist area

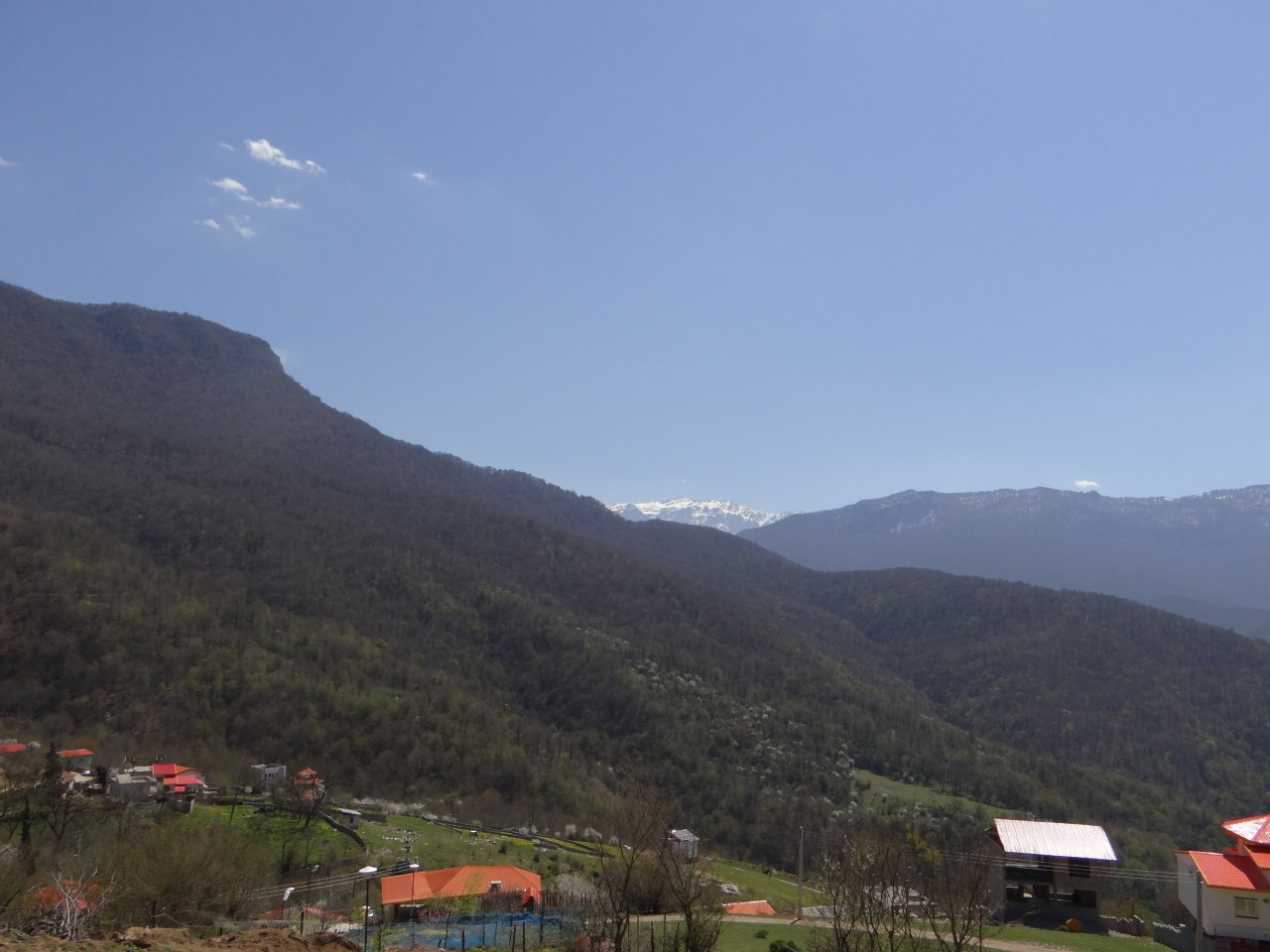
Azan Deh tourist area

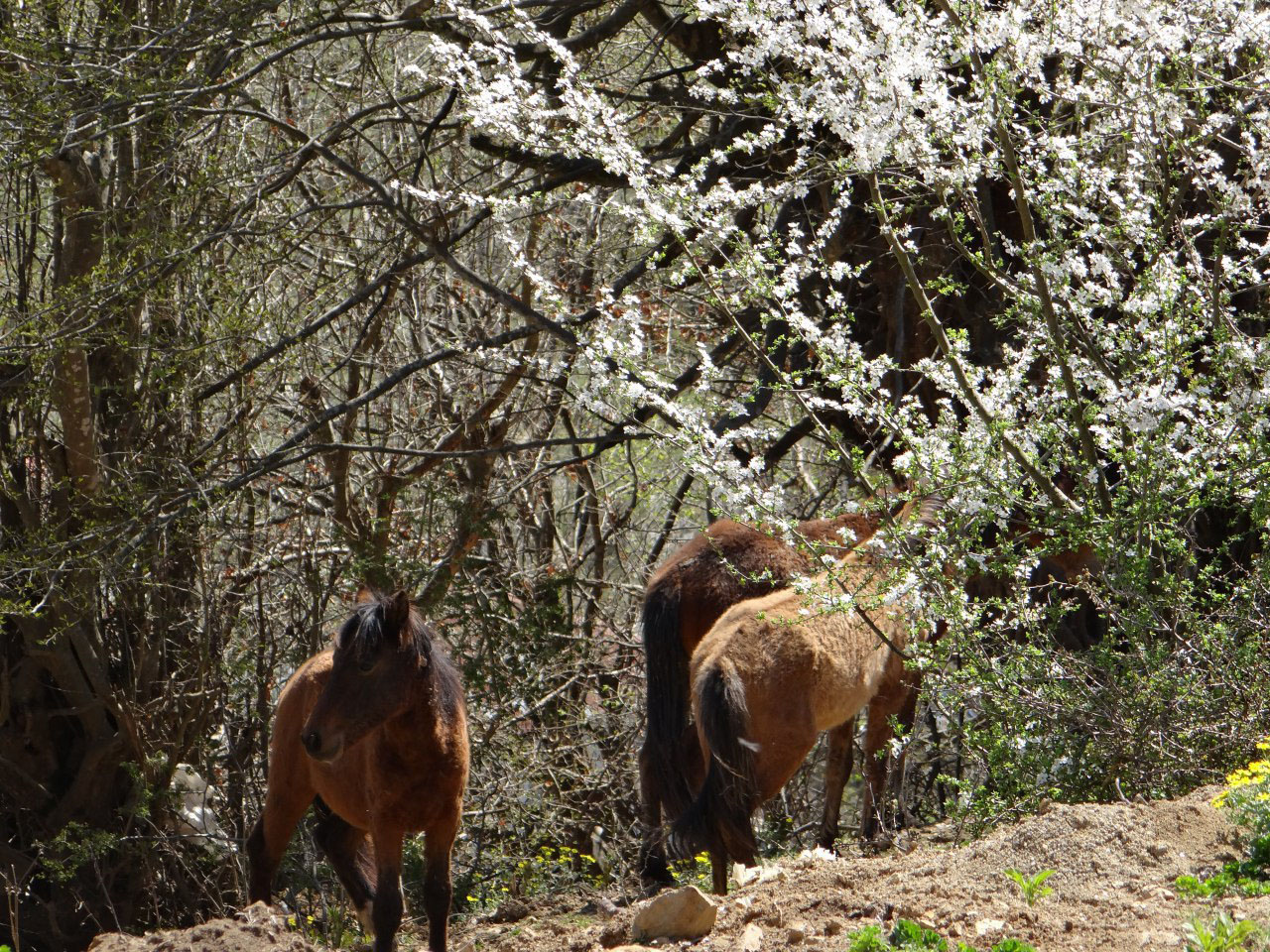
Azan Deh tourist area
