= Nematollah Aghasi =

Iranian singer and songwriter

Nematollah Aghasi نعمت‌الله آغاسی
- A picture of Nematollah Aghasi

Background information
- Also known as: Aghasi
- Born: Nematollah Azmoodeh; 21 July 1939; Ahvaz, Khuzestan province, Iran
- Origin: Ahvaz
- Died: 6 November 2005 (aged 66) Karaj, Iran
- Genres: traditional music; Pop; Popular music
- Occupations: Singer-songwriter, lyricist
- Years active: 1961–2003
- Labels: Taraneh; Caltex; Avang Records/Avang; Pars Video; MZM Records

Nematollah Azmoodeh (Persian: نعمت‌الله آزموده; 21 July 1939 – 6 November 2005), also known as Nematollah Aghasi (Persian: نعمت‌الله آغاسی) and commonly addressed by the mononym Aghasi (Persian: آغاسی or آقاسی), was an Iranian singer and songwriter. He was one of the most notable pre-Revolution singers.

== Biography ==
Aghasi was born on 21 July 1939 in Ahvaz. He was interested in sports and was active in the Taj Club of Ahvaz. As a young man, he began to read music.

Aghasi's songs include ("Amane" Persian: آمنه) and ("Labeh kaaroon" Persian: لب کارون). After his successful performances in Laleh-Zar, he was the first Laleh-Zari singer to have his voice broadcast on Iranian National Radio and Television.

Vaveyla Leyli was one of the songs played on Iranian Voice and television. A cover of this song was also released in 2012 by Shahram Shabpareh.

Andranik Madadian and Nematollah Aghasi once performed Ameneh in a joint US concert.

Two years before his death, Aghasi was allowed to return to the Pars Theater in Laleh-Zar, where he began his artistic career, for the first time since the Revolution. The event was so welcomed that the city closed the street in celebration.

In 2005, Aghasi died of a stroke at his home in Karaj, and he was buried in Emamzadeh Taher cemetery.

== Albums ==
- Naneh Nemat (ننه نعمت)
- Kheili Mamnoon (خیلی ممنون)
- Amane (آمنه)
- Motrebe Peer (مطرب پیر)
- Eyvallah (ایوالله)
- Mikham Beram Be Ahvaz (میخوام برم به اهواز)
- Aghasi (آغاسی)
- hadiyh mikonad (هدیه می کند)

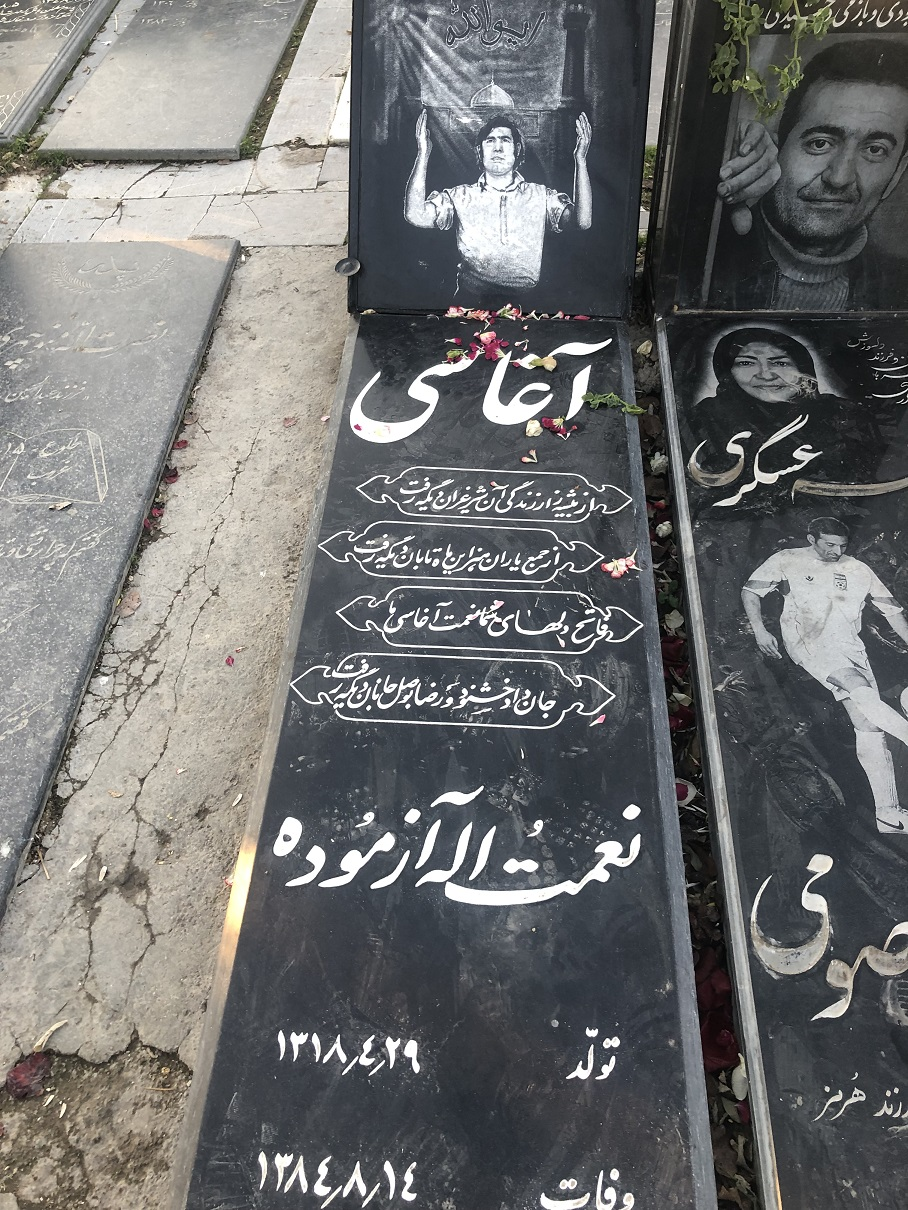
View of Aghasi's tombstone

== Discography ==
=== Amane آمنه ===
| Music Name | Songwriter | Composer | Arrangement | Persian native Name |
|---|---|---|---|---|
| Ba To ghahram | Bamdad Jouybari | Mohammad Nouri | | با تو قهرم |
| Gol Kashti | Bamdad Jouybari | Mohammad Nouri | | گل کاشتی |
| Dokhtare Hamsaye | | | | دختر همسایه |
| Door Az Yaranam | | | | دور از یارانم |
| Amane | | Nasser Tabrizi | | آمنه |
| Goli Joon | | | | گلی جون |
| Zibaye Bandar | | | | زیبای بندر |
| Soheyloo | | | | سهیلو |
| Nazet Konam | | | | نازت کنم |
| Har Shab Miaei | | | | هر شب میایی |
| Rosvaye Yar | | | | رسوای یار |
| Asemoon | | | | آسمون |

=== Bot Parast بت پرست ===
| Music Name | Songwriter | Composer | Arrangement | Persian native Name |
|---|---|---|---|---|
| Az To Sir Nemisham | Reza Shamsa | Nasser Tabrizi | | از تو سیر نمیشم |
| Nameh | Hussein Taghi Nia | Hussein Taghi Nia | | نامه |
| Goosh Bezang | Reza Shamsa | Nasser Tabrizi | | گوش به زنگ |
| Jodaei | Xashayar | Rashid Moradi | | جدایی |
| Dokhtar Daei | | | | دختر دایی |
| Bot Parast | Bamdad Jouybari | Nasser Tabrizi | | بت پرست |

=== Betarash Ey Sang Tarash بتراش ای سنگ تراش ===
| Music Name | Songwriter | Composer | Arrangement | Persian native Name |
|---|---|---|---|---|
| labeh kaaroon | Jahanbakhsh Mahmoori | Naser Ahanianmoghaddam | | لب کارون |
| Gole Pooneh | | | | گل پونه |
| Leily | Bamdad Jouybari | Mahmoud Hejazi | | لیلی |
| Khastegar | Iraj Janatie Ataie | Hossein Vaseghi | | خواستگار |
| Goosh Bezang | Reza Shamsa | Nasser Tabrizi | | گوش به زنگ |
| Entezar | Saeed Mahnaviyan | Saeed Mahnaviyan | | انتظار |
| Sheila | Firouz Branjian (Babak Radmanesh) | Firouz Branjian (Babak Radmanesh) | | شیلا |
| Maro Ba Digary | Bamdad Tohidi | Nasser Tabrizi | | مرو با دیگری |

=== Khoda Ro Khosh Nemiad خدا رو خوش نمیاد ===
| Music Name | Songwriter | Composer | Arrangement | Persian native Name |
|---|---|---|---|---|
| Soodabeh | | | | سودابه |
| Haji Firooz | | | | حاجی فیروز |
| Naneh Nemat | Reza Shamsa | Hossein Vaseghi | | ننه نعمت |
| Nashkan Nashkan | Reza Shamsa | Hossein Vaseghi | | نشکن نشکن |
| Khata | | | | خطا |
| Gham | | | | غم |
| Ba To Ghahram | | | | با تو قهرم |
| Meykhoonehchi | | | | میخونه چی |
| Goosh Bezang | | | | گوش به زنگ |
| Khoda Ro Khosh Nemiad | Ali Naseri | Naser Ahanianmoghaddam | | خدا رو خوش نمیاد |
| Kheyli Ham Mamnoon | | | | خیلی هم ممنون |
| Akhmato Vakon | | | | اخماتو واکن |
| Dele Azad | | | | دل آزاد |
| Setareh | | | | ستاره |

=== Mikham Beram Be Ahvaz میخوام برم به اهواز ===
| Music Name | Songwriter | Composer | Arrangement | Persian native Name |
|---|---|---|---|---|
| Delam Mikhad | Khanoome Partoo | Khanoome Partoo | | دلم می خواد |
| Maryam | Ebrahim Bahmanpour | Ghadimi | | مریم |
| Aroosi | | | | عروسی |
| Yadam Kon | Bamdad Jouybari | Aref Ibrahim Pur | | یادم کن |
| Dokhtar Khoshgel | Rahman Shokoufehpour | Aref Ibrahim Pur | | دختر خوشگله |
| Ba Ye Tir Dou Neshoon | Nasrollah Riahpour | Amiroushang Fathi | | با ی تیر دو نشون |
| Ham Faal O Ham Tamasha | Abolfazl Edabi | Amiroushang Fathi | | هم فال و هم تماشا |
| Elahi emshab sobh nashe | Nasrollah Riahpour | Firouz Branjian (Babak Radmanesh) | | الهی امشب صبح نشه |
| Khate Ghermez | Nasrollah Riahpour | Firouz Branjian (Babak Radmanesh) | | خط قرمز |
| Payaam | Bamdad Jouybari | Aref Ibrahim Pur | | پیام |
| Saghi | Ali Darestani | قاسم رئیس نژاد | | ساقی |
| Sheila | Firouz Branjian (Babak Radmanesh) | Firouz Branjian (Babak Radmanesh) | | شیلا |

=== Naneh Nemat ننه نعمت ===
| Music Name | Songwriter | Composer | Arrangement | Persian native Name |
|---|---|---|---|---|
| Alhavar | | | | الهوار |
| Vay Be Delam Agar Barnagardi | | | | وای به دلم اگر بر نگردی |
| Avazeh Khan | | | | آوازه خان |
| Negahat Atish | | | | نگاهت آتیش |
| Raghs | | | | رقص |
| Mehr O Vafa | | | | مهر و وفا |
| Dele Azad | | | | دل آزاد |
| Naneh Nemat | Reza Shamsa | Hossein Vaseghi | | ننه نعمت |
| Setareh | | | | ستاره |
| Khata | | | | خطا |
| Nashkan Nashkan | Reza Shamsa | Hossein Vaseghi | | نشکن نشکن |
| Khoshgeleh | | | | خوشگله |

=== Kheili Mamnoon خیلی ممنون ===
| Music Name | Songwriter | Composer | Arrangement | Persian native Name |
|---|---|---|---|---|
| Elahi emshab sobh nashe | | | | الاهی امشب صبح نشه |
| Dokhtar Khoshgel | | | | دختر خوشگله |
| Saghi | Jahanbakhsh Mahmoori | Kiomars Salimpour | | ساقی |
| Yadam Kon | | | | یادم کن |
| Sheila | Firouz Branjian (Babak Radmanesh) | Firouz Branjian (Babak Radmanesh) | | شیلا |
| Mey O Mey O Mey Bazam Mey | Firouz Branjian (Babak Radmanesh) | Firouz Branjian (Babak Radmanesh) | | می و می می بازم می |
| Ham Faal O Ham Tamasha | | | | هم فال و هم تماشا |
| Ba Yek Tir Dou Neshoon | | | | با یک تیر دو نشون |
| Khate Ghermez | | | | |
| Hanoz Dir Nashodeh | | | | |

=== Gol Kashti گل کاشتی ===
| Music Name | Songwriter | Composer | Arrangement | Persian native Name |
|---|---|---|---|---|
| Zamaneh | | | | زمانه |
| Gol Kashti | | | | گل کاشتی |
| Maryam | | | | مریم |
| Iran | | | | ایران |
| Mageh Misheh | | | | مگه میشه |
| Fal | | | | فال |

=== Eyvallah ایوالله ===
| Music Name | Songwriter | Composer | Arrangement | Persian native Name |
|---|---|---|---|---|
| Eyvallah | Reza Shamsa | Hossein Vaseghi | | ایوالله |
| Nemitoonam Bavar Konam | Reza Shamsa | Hossein Vaseghi | | نمیتونم باور کنم |
| Ghomare Zendegi | Reza Shamsa | Hossein Vaseghi | | قمار زندگی |
| Yeki Yekdooneh | | | | یکی یک دونه |
| Gole Poneh | | | | گل پونه |
| Ghameh Tanhay | Reza Shamsa | Hossein Vaseghi | | غم تنهایی |
| Khastegar | | | | خواستگار |
| Na Vala | | | | نه والا |
| Har Ki Ke Mehrabooneh | Reza Shamsa | Hossein Vaseghi | | هرکی که مهربونه |
| Cheshme Arezoo | | | | چشم آرزو |
| Ghol O Gharar | | | | قول و قرار |
| Dele Divooneh | | | | دل دیوونه |

=== Motrebe Peer مطرب پیر ===
| Music Name | Songwriter | Composer | Arrangement | Persian native Name |
|---|---|---|---|---|
| Oomadam | Ali Fakhari | Yadullah Badr | Yadullah Badr | اومدم |
| Motrebe Peer | Ali Fakhari | Yadullah Badr | Yadullah Badr | مطرب پیر |
| Sang Tarash | Ali Fakhari | Yadullah Badr | Yadullah Badr | سنگ‌تراش |
| Yadeteh | Ali Fakhari | Yadullah Badr | Yadullah Badr | یادته |
| Ali Gooyam | Ali Fakhari | Yadullah Badr | Yadullah Badr | علی گویم |
| Shoghe Vesal | Ali Fakhari | Yadullah Badr | Yadullah Badr | شوق وصال |

=== Single Songs ===
- Afsaneh
- Akharin Negah
- Ashti
- Bia Barimesh
- Del Shodeh Yek Kaseh Khoon
- Dokhtare in Shahr
- Ghaliche
- Gol Nesar
- Meyhana Iraqi
- Nazi Nazi
- Sar Pol Dezfil
- Shir Ali Mardoon
- Vavaeyla Leili
- Dokhtareh Abadani
- Dokhtre Bala
- Delgir
- Rosva
- Rooze Jomeh
- Shab Cheragh
- Shab Karoon

== Filmography ==
Aghasi also worked as a film actor. He was invited to working in cinema by Manouchehr Nozari. He has recorded ten films throughout his career.

Film Actor

- Khoda ghovvat (1977)
- Yeki khosh seda, yeki khosh dast (1977)
- Farrash-bashi (1975)
- Bandeh Khoda (1974)
- Nemat Nafti (1973)
- Kheili ham mamnoon (1972)
- Fatehe Delha (1972)
- Eyvallah (1971)
- Samad Va Ghalicheyeh Hazrat-e Soleyman (1971)
- Jafar va Golnar (1970)

Music department

- Khoda ghovvat (singer)
- Yeki khosh seda, yeki khosh dast (singer)
- Farrash-bashi (singer)
- Nemat Nafti (singer)
- Fatehe Delha (singer)
- Jafar va Golnar (singer)

== Gallery ==
Nematollah Aghasi and Ebi

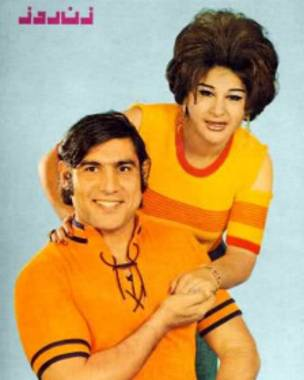
Nematollah Aghasi and Susan on the cover on Zan-e Rooz magazine, 1970s
