= Naser Cheshmazar =

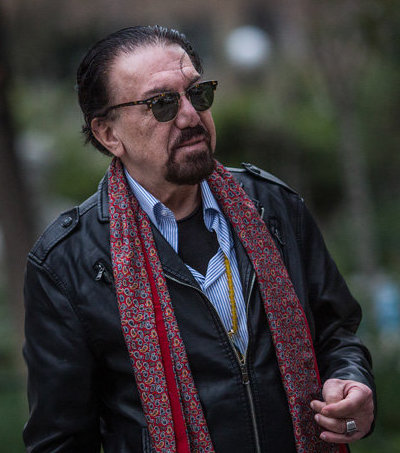

Background information
- Born: 31 December 1950; Ardabil, Iran
- Died: 4 May 2018 (aged 67) Tehran, Iran
- Genres: Classical
- Occupations: Music director, choir and orchestra conductor, pianist, composer, arranger, vocal music (for a singer or choir), electronic music, classical music, musical theater, blues, folk music, jazz, and popular music
- Instruments: Piano, synthesizer, accordion
- Years active: 1962–2018

Naser Cheshmazar (31 December 1950 – 4 May 2018) was an Iranian musician and composer. He was an acknowledged master in classical music, musical theater, blues, folk music, jazz, and popular music. He composed many songs for well-known Iranian singers including Hayedeh, Googoosh, Mahasti, Dariush, Sattar, Ebi, Leila Forouhar.

== Early life ==
Naser was born on the last day of 1950 in Ardabil. His father taught him the basics of Persian traditional music during his childhood when he picked accordion as his very first instrument to begin his musical life.

== Career ==
At the age of 12, Naser and his father both joined the Azerbaijan Orchestra at Radio Iran. He soon showed his musical talent and earned his first award for playing accordion as a junior high school student. He conducted an orchestra at the Iranian Embassy in Iraq when he was only 17. Just one year later, he started his professional career by going on tour with Googoosh. At age 20, he took an elementary course on jazz music in the United States. When returned home, he became the orchestra conductor of Parviz Gharib Afshar Show. The young Naser also served great masters like Morteza Hannaneh and the Armenian Emanuel Melik-Aslanian. In 1978, he again took a five-year course on jazz plus film score in the United States. Thereafter, he became a pioneer in introducing electronic musical instruments into the musical scene of Iran. Cheshmazar's first step in his long path of film score was his collaboration in a movie called Taraj directed by Iraj Ghaderi. He is best known for his album Rain of Love, which is inspired by the laments of mothers of Iranian soldiers who lost their lives in the Iran-Iraq War.
