= Laleh-Zar Street =

Street in Tehran, Iran

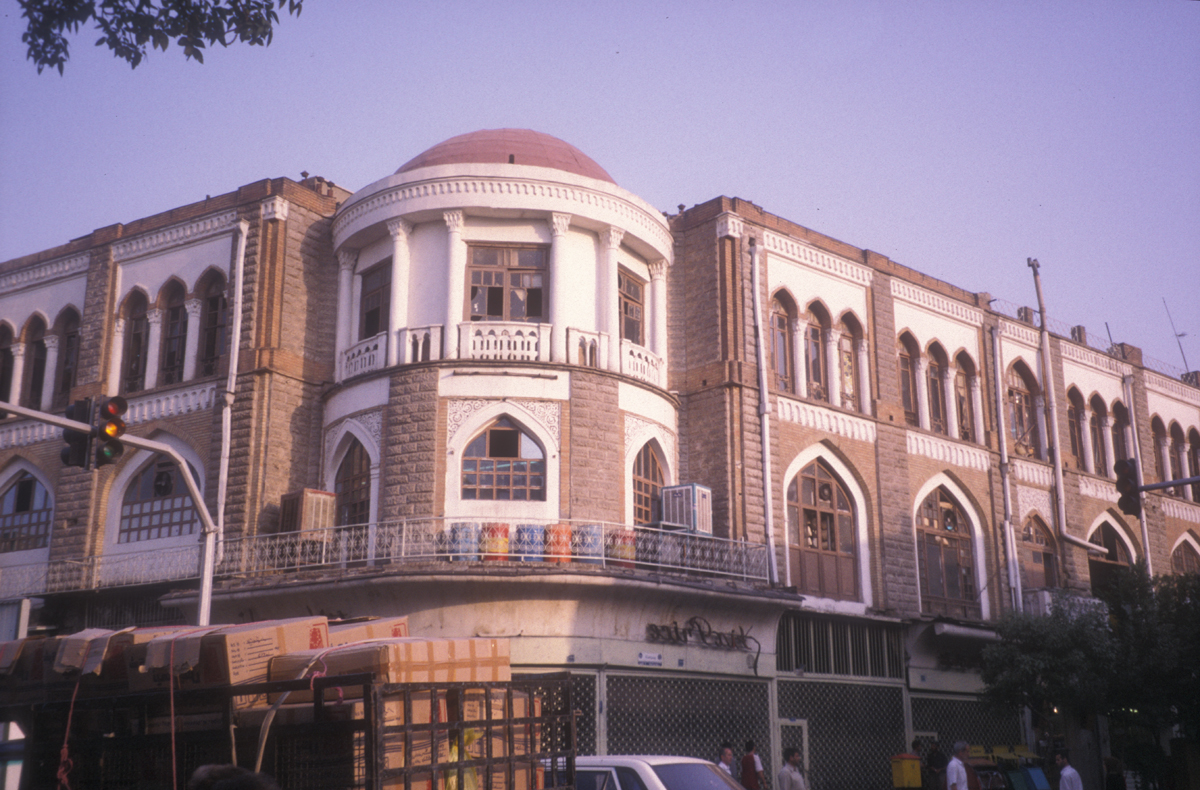
- Interactive map of Laleh-Zar Street
- Native name: خیابان لاله‌زار (Persian)
- North end: Enqelab Street
- South end: Toopkhaneh square

Construction
- Completion: c. 1873

Laleh-Zar street (Persian: خیابان لاله‌زار) is one of the oldest streets of Tehran, Iran. This street is bordered to the south by Toopkhaneh Square, and to the north by Enqelab Street (former Reza Shah Street).

At the end of the Qajar era and beginning of the Pahlavi era, it was a symbol of modernism and art of Iran and was known as "Tehran's Champs-Élysées". Many theaters, restaurants, businesses, cabarets, dish-sellers, dressmakers, cinemas, and famous shops were located in this street.

Laleh-Zar district was once the street in which all the cinema of Tehran were placed. The first movie in the history of Iran was shown in the Laleh cinema. This cinema itself was first inaugurated in 1945 and prior to that this region was once the place of Mosafa garden, a Royal garden for the families and a place for the diplomats.

This street is also the birthplace of the first passage of Iran based on a western architecture.

Due to the interest of Qajars and the western layout of this street also many other advancements first started right here. For instance, The first telegram wire of Tehran was initiated in this sub region and since then many things have changed.

== History ==
Laleh-Zar Street, at the time it was constructed the length was eight hundred steps, which started from Toopkhaneh Square and reached the Laleh-Zar square. This street was named Laleh-Zar because before it was full of wild tulips and beautiful trees, which was one of the royal resorts at that time. The eastern part of it leads to the Philikhaneh and the western part leads to Ala al-Dowleh Street.

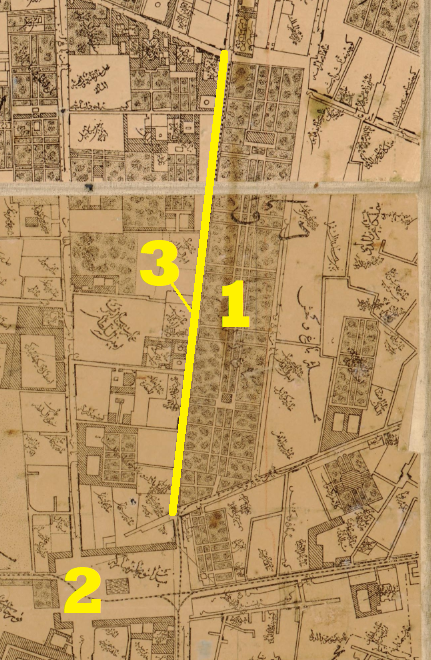
1. Lalehzar garden, 2. Toopkhaneh Square, 3. Lalehzar street, 1889 map

In 1873, after Naser al-Din Shah Qajar's first trip to Europe, he decided to construct a street (Laleh-Zar) through this area. In Europe, he had seen long streets and large squares and, inspired by their beauty, he tried to create a Champs Elysees in Tehran. By his order, they cut the trees and destroyed this green area, and its lands were divided among the royal family, a significant part of which was given to Mirza Ali Asghar Khan Amin al-Soltan.

Laleh-Zar Street had a wagon line on the surface and the Grand Hotel. A car can pass in the middle of the street. It has wooden electric poles, called Shah Sim and also, cast iron telegraph poles.

During the Pahlavi era, singers of Iranian popular music like Mahvash, Afat, Ghasem Jebeli, Tajik, Roohparvar, Ali Nazari, Aghasi, Soosan, and Iraj Habibi all sang in cabarets on this street.

Jafar Shahri, in the book "Old Tehran", notes that

Eshghi and Aref were performing their best works in Laleh-Zar's Grand Hotel amphitheater, and waggish ladies with European styles along with tall boys, were going there from the beginning of night, and most fashionable men and stylish women could be found in that street.

At one time, there were 15 cinemas and multiple theaters active there, however today only ten cinemas are active in this street, most of which have lost their popularity.

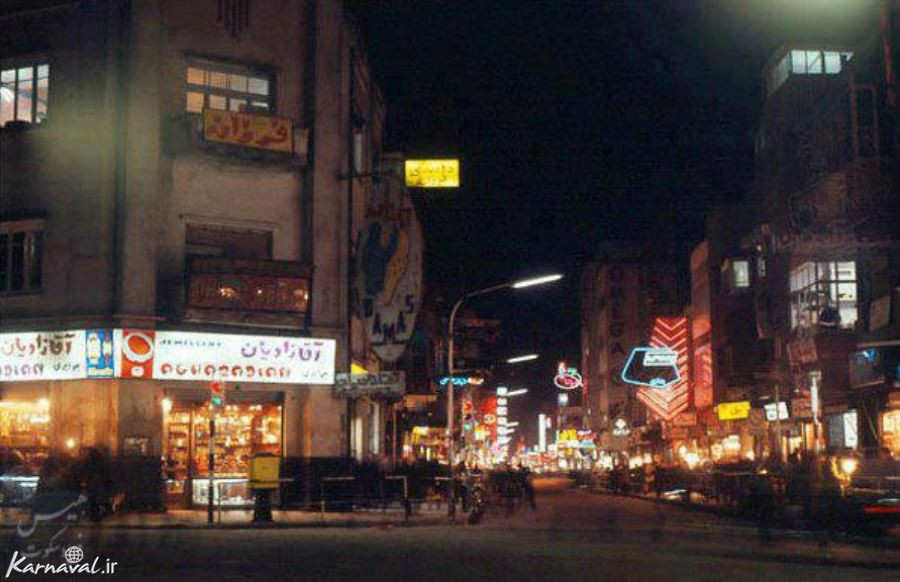
Lalehzar street in 1973

One of the gathering centers of cabarets in the city was Laleh-Zar Street. Famous cabarets were active in the city until the Iranian revolution in 1979. They also introduced many domestic artists. In common language, cabaret sometimes called "home of dance" (Persian: رقاص‌خانه) or "dancing place".

== Culture ==
=== Theatrical entertainment ===
One of the gathering centers of cabarets in the city was Laleh-Zar Street. Many Iranian women also started their theatrical dance career in this street.

== Gallery ==
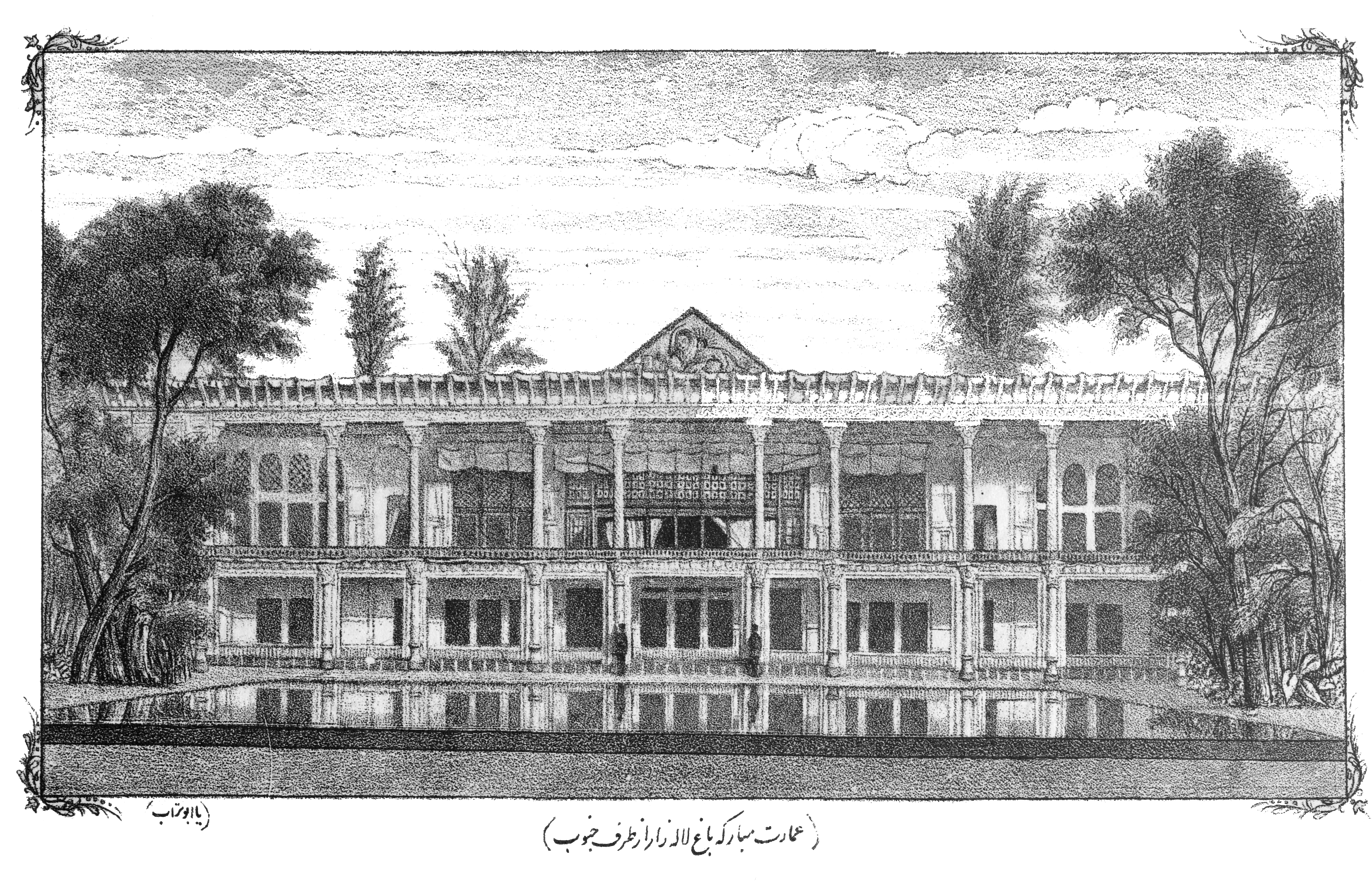
Sketch of Lalehzar mansion by Abu Torab Ghaffari, 1884

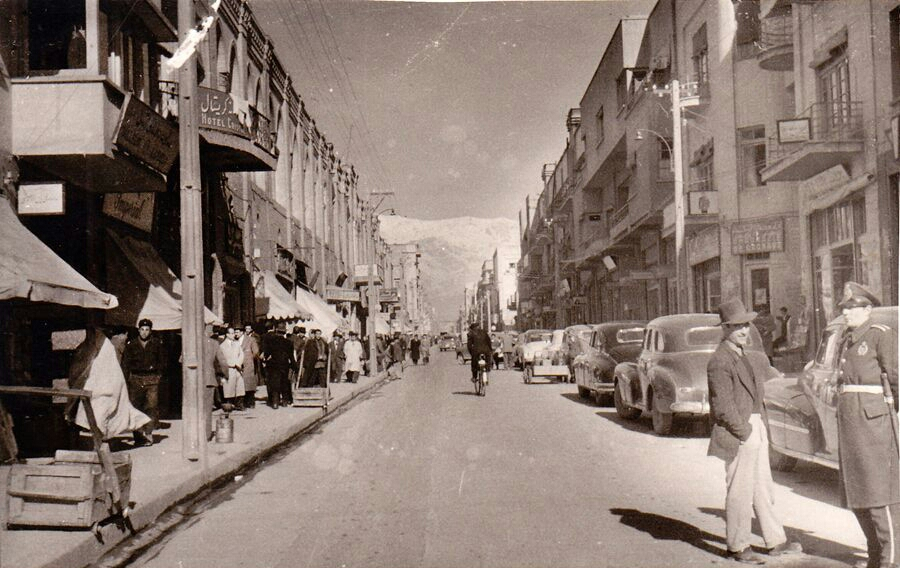
Lalehzar street in the 1940s

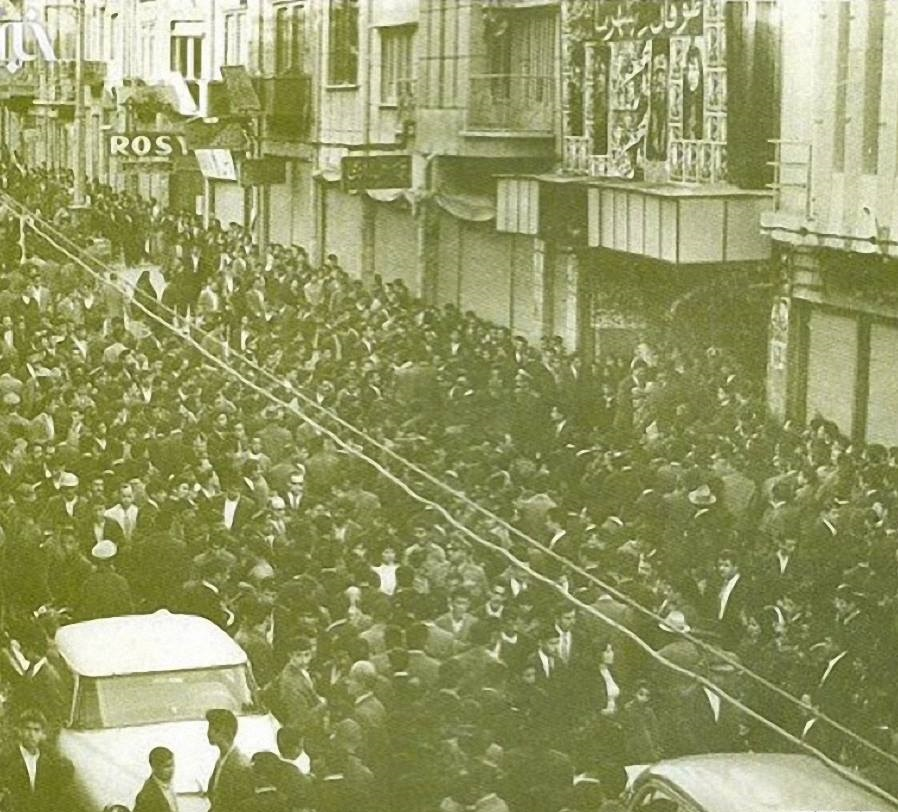

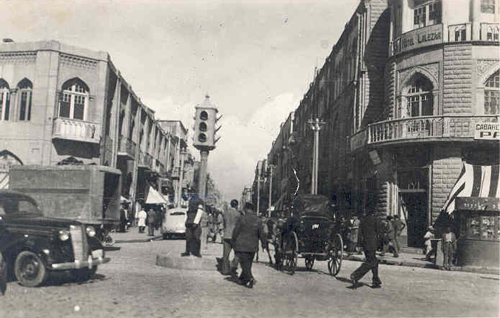

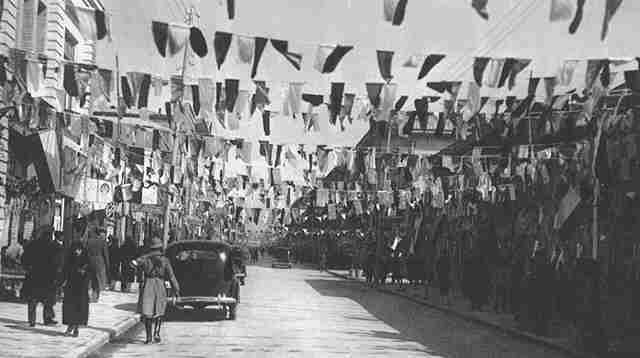

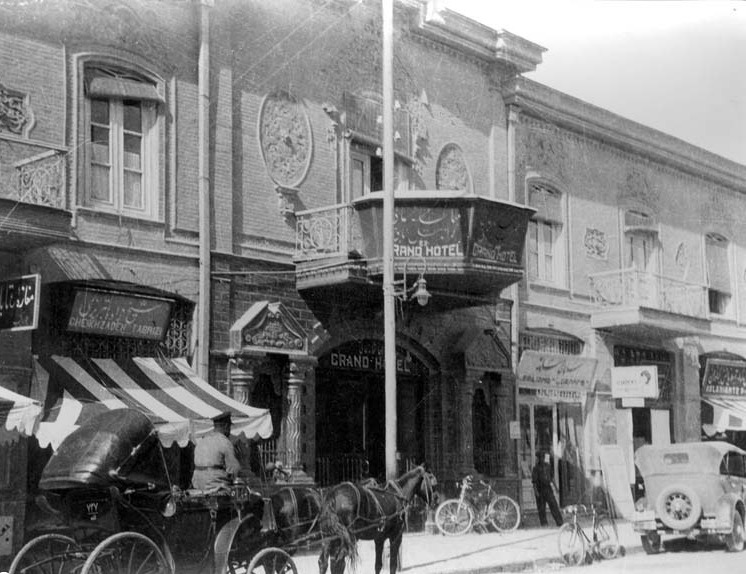
Tehran Grand Hotel

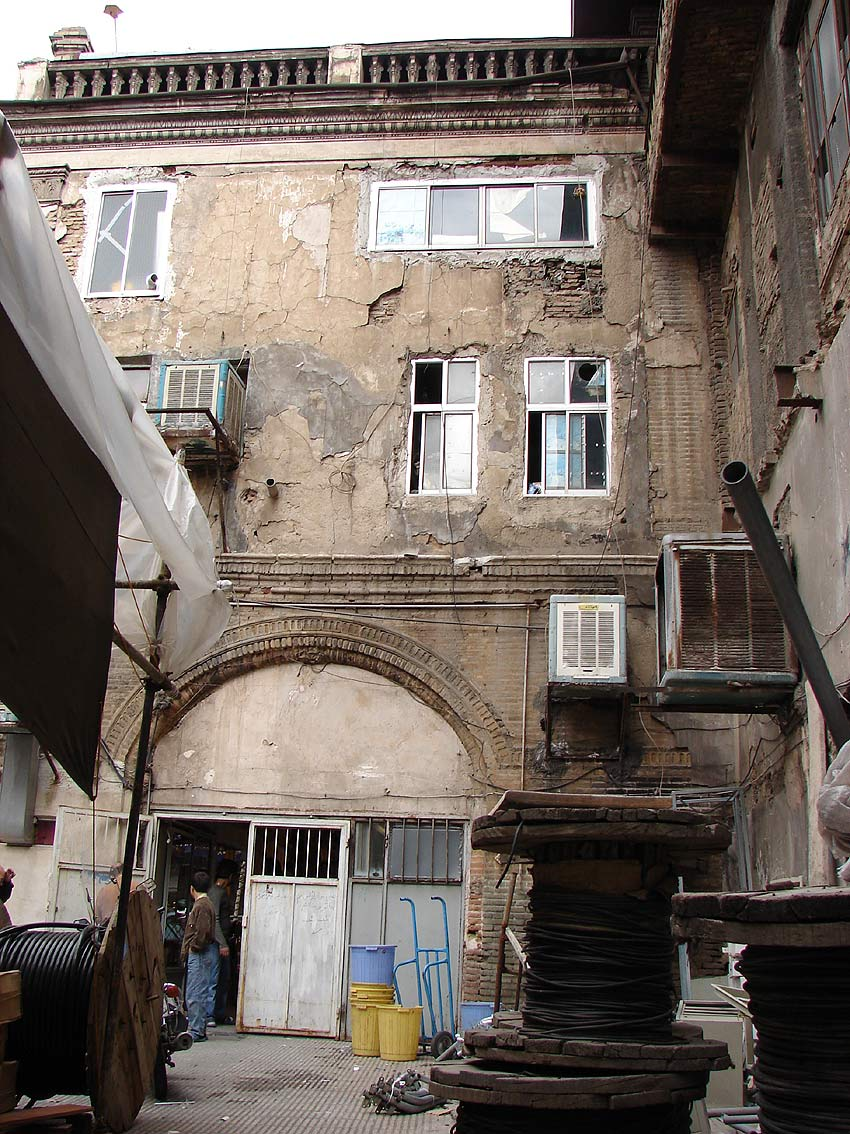
Tehran Grand Hotel, 2008

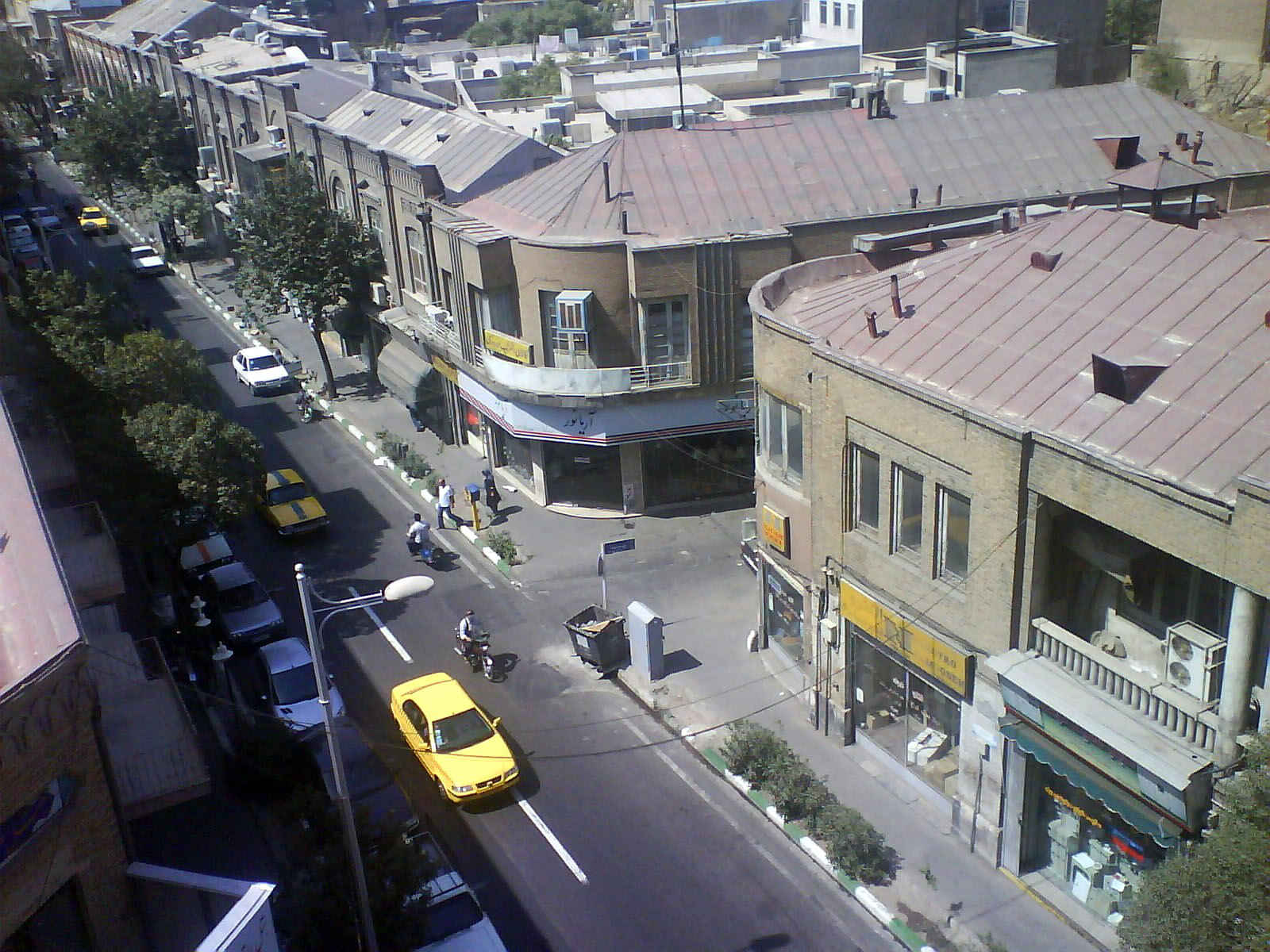
Lalehzar street, 2010

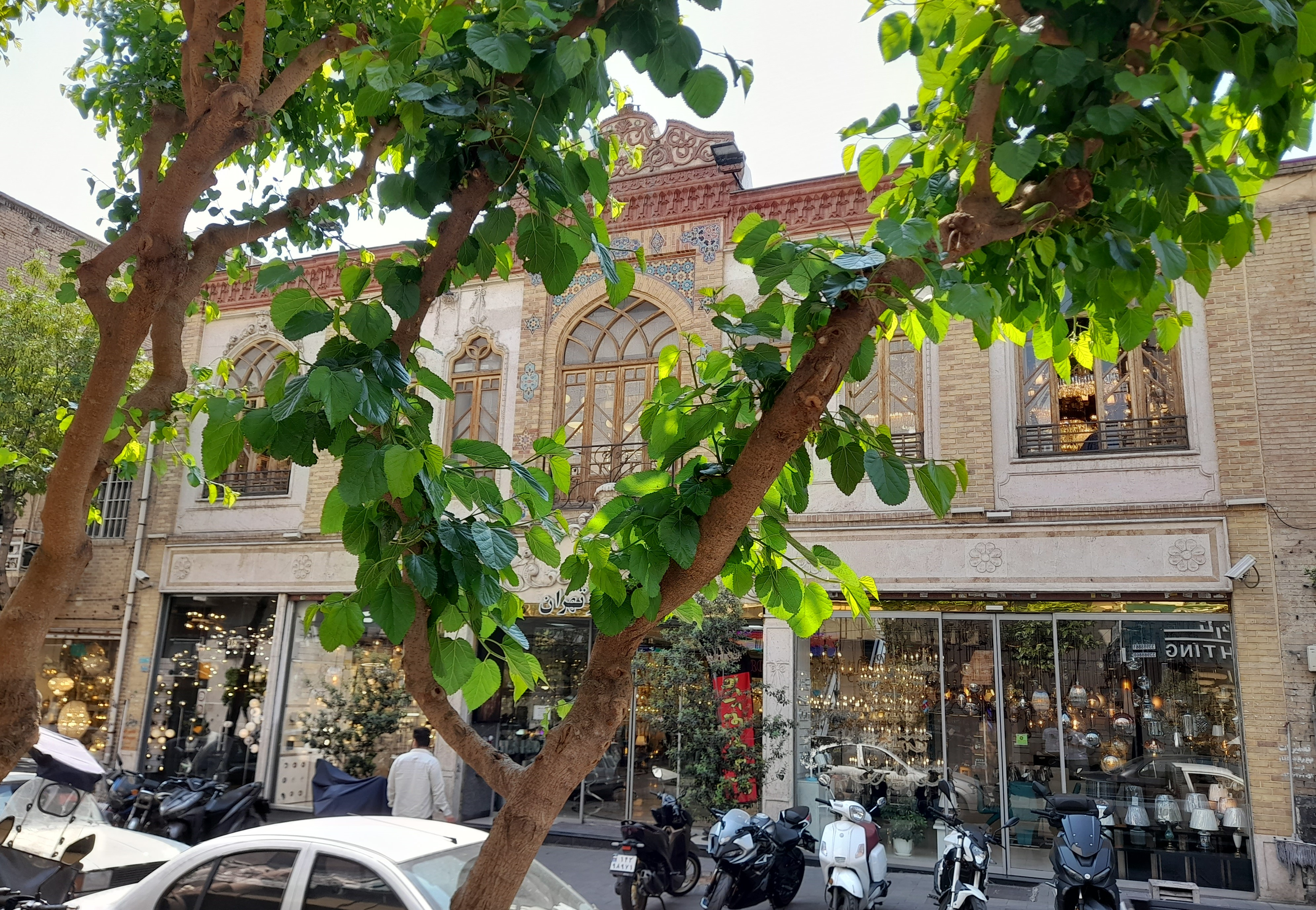
Historic building on Lalehzar street, 2023
