= Mohammad Shams =

Iranian composer and conductor (born 1954)

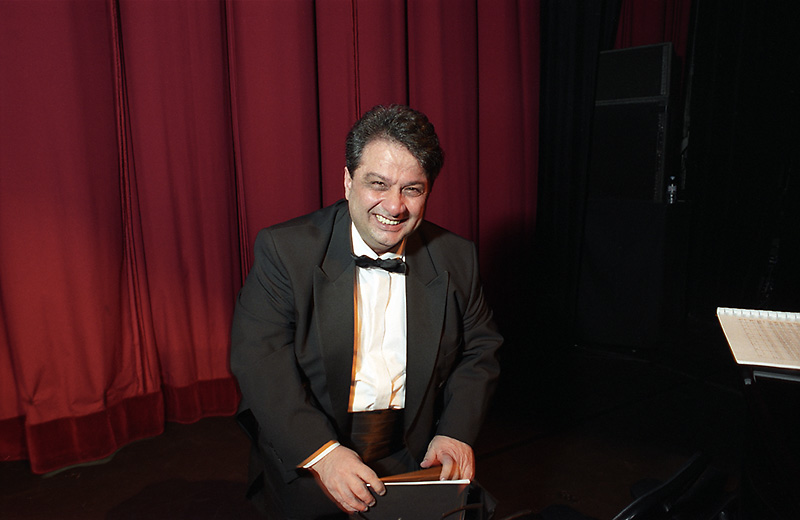
- Born: 1954 (age 71–72)

Details
- Country: Iran
- Location: Paris

Mohammad Shams (Persian: محمد شمس, born 1954 in Tehran) is an Iranian composer and conductor. Born in a family of musicians, he has composed more than 650 pieces of traditional, classical and modern music.

Despite the troubles an artist in exile must face, Shams found ways to introduce Classical Persian music in international events such as the London Festival in England.

He describes his music as deeply connected to poetry and the roots of Persian music. His style is characterized by its amplitude and precision, with a keen focus on tones and sounds, contrasts, and orchestral material rich in expression.
