= Rahim Moeini Kermanshahi =

Iranian poet (1923–2015)

Rahim Moeini Kermanshahi رحیم معینی کرمانشاهی
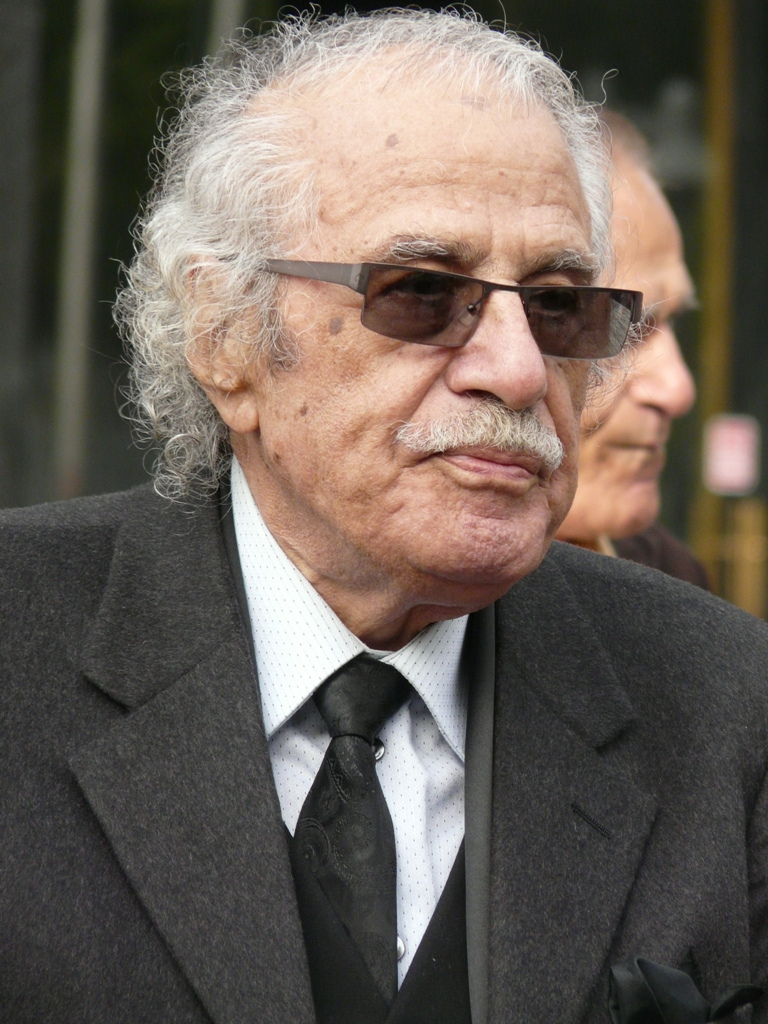
- Moeini Kermanshahi in 2009
- Born: February 6, 1923; Kermanshah, Iran
- Died: November 17, 2015 (aged 92); Tehran, Iran
- Occupations: Poet, Songwriter
- Spouse: Eshrat Atoofi (m. 1946; died 2013)
- Children: 5

Rahim Moeini Kermanshahi (Persian: رحیم معینی کرمانشاهی, February 6, 1923 – November 17, 2015) was an Iranian poet and lyricist. He is one of the pioneering songwriters in the history of Persian traditional music.

== Biography ==
Master Rahim Moeini Kermanshahi was born in 1922 in Kermanshah, Iran. He left his hometown at a young age for Tehran to pursue painting. Among his famous paintings is a charcoal of Christ blessing some children. His talent and creativity in poetry made him one of the greatest lyricists, poets, and historians of Iran. During his 60 years' dedication to Persian literature and poetry he published over 20 books and wrote the lyrics of about 500 songs. His musical works are being remastered every year by various artists in different countries, mostly in Iran and the United States. In 2013, one of his songs, "Ecstacy", was played on Fox Productions TV series How I Met Your Mother.

== Personal life and death ==
He was married to Eshrat Atoofi from 1946 to her death on July 5, 2013. Together they had five children. Shirin, Hossein, Noushin, Maryam, and Farhad. He died on November 17, 2015, at the age of 93 at Jam Hospital in Tehran.
