= Morteza Hannaneh =

Iranian composer 1923–1989

Morteza Hannaneh مرتضی حنانه
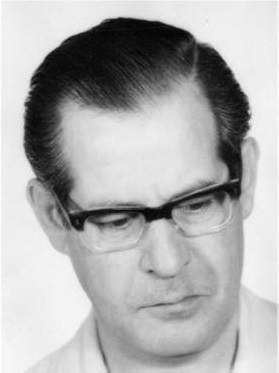

Background information
- Born: 1 March 1923; Tehran, Iran
- Died: 17 October 1989 (aged 66) Tehran, Iran
- Genre: Persian symphonic music
- Occupations: Composer, musician
- Instruments: Oboe, horn, piano
- Formerly of: Tehran Symphony Orchestra
- Spouse(s): Behjat Sadr (divorced); Azar Azima

Morteza Hannaneh (Persian: مرتضی حنانه; 1 March 1923 – 17 October 1989) was an Iranian composer and musician.

He composed for some movies, such as Fleeing the Trap in 1971.

== Musical career ==
Hannaneh studied horn at the Tehran Conservatory and basic composition under Parviz Mahmoud. Together, Hannaneh and Mahmoud are considered founders of the Tehran Symphony Orchestra. For a short period he was the orchestra's principal conductor from 1953 to 1955s. Hannaneh also studied composition in Italy; and after his return to Iran, he established Farabi Orchestra at Radio Tehran in 1963. He won the first prize of (International Rostrum of Composers), 6–11 June 1966 "House of UNESCO", Paris.

Hannaneh also composed music for Iranian movies and is said to be the first Iranian composer to do so.

One of his most famous compositions for the cinema is the music he composed for Hezar Dastan, a movie directed by Ali Hatami.

Hannaneh's most important works include "The Execrable Capriccio per pianoforte e Orchestra"; "Hezar Dastan Overture" (on a melody by Morteza Neydavoud; for symphonic orchestra); "In Memory of Ferdowsi" (for soprano and piano), the books "Lost Scales"; "The Even Harmony"; (in Persian), etc.

Hannaneh also composed two melodies ("Omaggio a Saadi" & "Omaggio a Ferdowsi") for voice and piano, which were recorded for the first time on the album "Sounds of Ancestors" by Anousha Nazari.

== See also ==
- Music of Iran
- List of Iranian musicians
