= Hayedeh: Legendary Persian Diva =

2009 film

- Premier Poster designed by Kamran Ashtary & Tori Egherman
- Directed by: Pejman Akbarzadeh
- Produced by: Pejman Akbarzadeh
- Edited by: Mostafa Heravi; Gregory Macousi
- Distributed by: Persian Dutch Network
- Release date: January 24, 2009
- Running time: 100 minutes
- Country: Netherlands
- Languages: Persian; Hebrew

Hayedeh: Legendary Persian Diva (Persian: سخن از هایده) is a 2009 documentary film about the late Iranian iconic singer Hayedeh, made by the exiled musician and journalist Pejman Akbarzadeh in The Netherlands.

The 100-minute documentary was filmed in France, Germany, the Netherlands, the United Kingdom and the United States. The language of the film is Persian.

Hayedeh was released on 20 January 2010, the 20th death anniversary of Hayedeh. The DVD was released by Persian Dutch Network in Amsterdam.

== Content ==
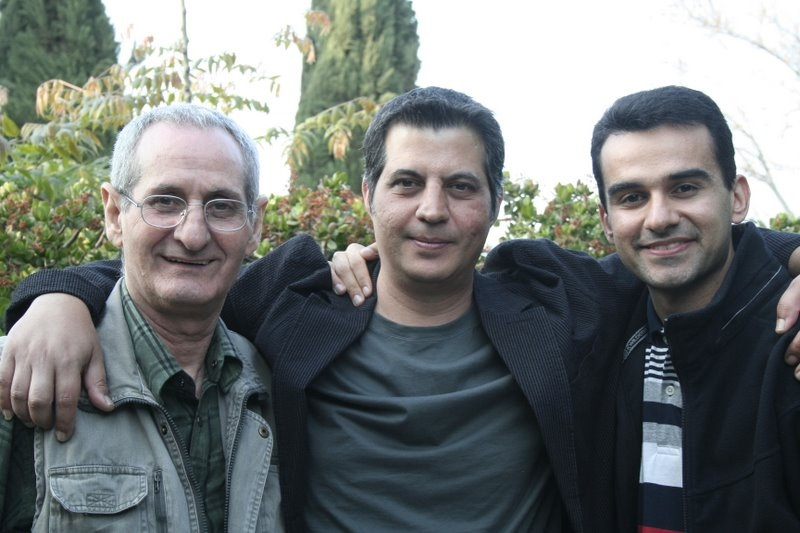
Andranik, Parviz Rahman-Panah, Pejman Akbarzadeh, Los Angeles, 2008

Hayedeh: Legendary Persian Diva contains an extensive review of the singers's artistic activities beginning in the late 1960s at Radio Tehran and ending in 1990 in California.

Hayedeh looks at Hayedeh's career against the backdrop of political and social upheaval in Iran as the nation went from monarchy to revolution to protracted war that forced many of its best and brightest into exile. In one of the first frames of the documentary, the director wrote: "Since the 1979 revolution in Iran), which brought a religious government to power, women have not been allowed to sing in public. All Iranian women singers were forced to end their careers and many of them moved abroad to sing. Hayedeh (1942–1990) was one of those who fled Iran."

Hayedeh includes rare videos, audio clips, photos, and original interviews with the main figures of her career: the songwriters Andranik, Mohammad Heydari, Anooshirvan Rohani, Farid Zoland, Sadegh Nojouki, producer Manouchehr Bibiyan, conductor Farnoush Behzad, music critic Mahmoud Khoshnam, tar soloist Parviz Rahman-Panah, and the last Empress of Iran Farah Pahlavi.

The documentary has been dedicated to the memory of Amir Zamanifar, a close friend of Pejman Akbarzadeh and Radio Farda's correspondent in Prague who was killed in a car crash in 2009.

== Reception ==
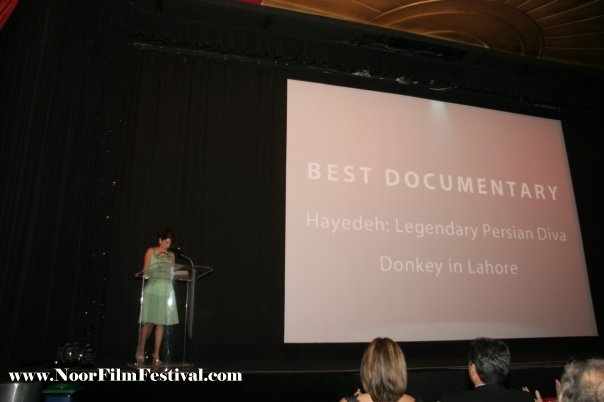
The film was nominated as "best documentary" at Noor Film Festival in Los Angeles, May 2009

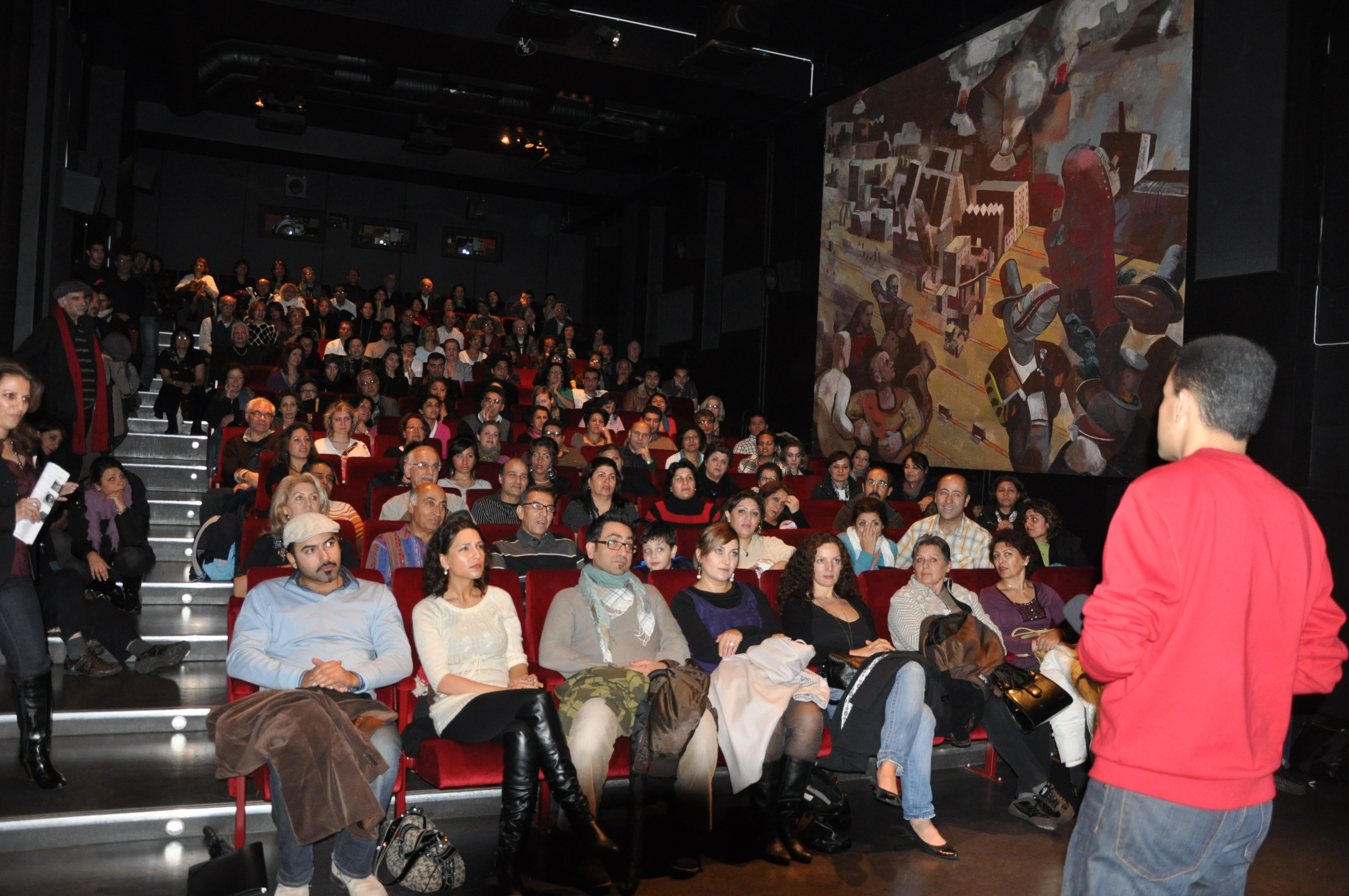
Question and Answer Session After Sold-out Screening in International Exile Film Festival, Sweden, October 2009

Hayedeh for the first time was screened on January 24, 2009, at Griffioen Cultural Center, associated to Amsterdam Vrije Universiteit. The event was organized on the occasion of 19th Anniversary of Hayedeh's death in exile. Holland's Persian community and US-/Europe-based Persian-language media warmly received the event. Before the screening, Voice of America's Persian TV, BBC Persian Radio, Radio Farda, etc. interviewed the director and broadcast the trailer.

In April 2009 the documentary was screened in an event organized by Rahaward Cultural Center in Aachen. In the German city some leftist Persian immigrants boycotted the event. Deutsche Welle correspondent wrote: "About 25 people were present for viewing the film, which was a source of bewilderment and disenchantment of the filmmaker and organizers of the event."

Hayedeh had its sold-out US premiere at the 3rd Noor Iranian Film Festival in Los Angeles on May 1, 2009. After the screening, Persian-American Hollywood director Reza Badiyi, in an interview with Homa Sarshar on Radio 670 KIRN, described itt as a "Chapter on the beauties of Hayedeh life". The documentary was also nominated as the "best documentary" at Noor Film Festival but according to BBC Persian TV's Aslan Hafezi: "Presentation of unveiled information in the film caused the objections of some of Hayedeh's relations and fans."

Hayedeh was also screened at the 9th International Exile Film Festival in Gothenburg, Sweden in October 2009. Following the sold-out screening at Hagabion Hall and in a review for BBC Persian website, Hooman Khalatbari, a Graz-based opera conductor, wrote: "this is the first Persian documentary which covers all aspects of a singer's career and almost all important figures in the singer's artistic activity are present there". The opera conductor also wrote: "I believe Hayedeh's work will remain as a cultural memento for the next Persian generations."

Hayedeh was also screened in December 2009 at the 4th Iranian Film Festival in Zaandam, Holland.

The documentary was screened at the 8th International Festival of Iranian Cinema in Exile in Paris in April 2010 and will also be presented at the Iranian Festival in Seattle in June 2010.

In May 2010 the leftist Israeli newspaper Haaretz published a comprehensive article about the film by Noam Ben-Zeev, a professor at University of Haifa. Ben-Zeev cited the documentary as a film which shows the "Rise and Fall of Hayedeh".

In July 2013, Holland Times wrote about the film: "Through a mixture of original footage dating back as far as the 1960s as well as contemporary interviews, the viewer is given great insight into the musical make up of Persia at the time..."

== Reaction from Iran's governmental media ==
In September 2009 the semi-official Fars News Agency in Tehran criticized Pejman Akbarzadeh for making a film about the "corrupt monarchist singer, Hayedeh".
