= Mostafa Heravi =

Iranian art administrator (born 1974)

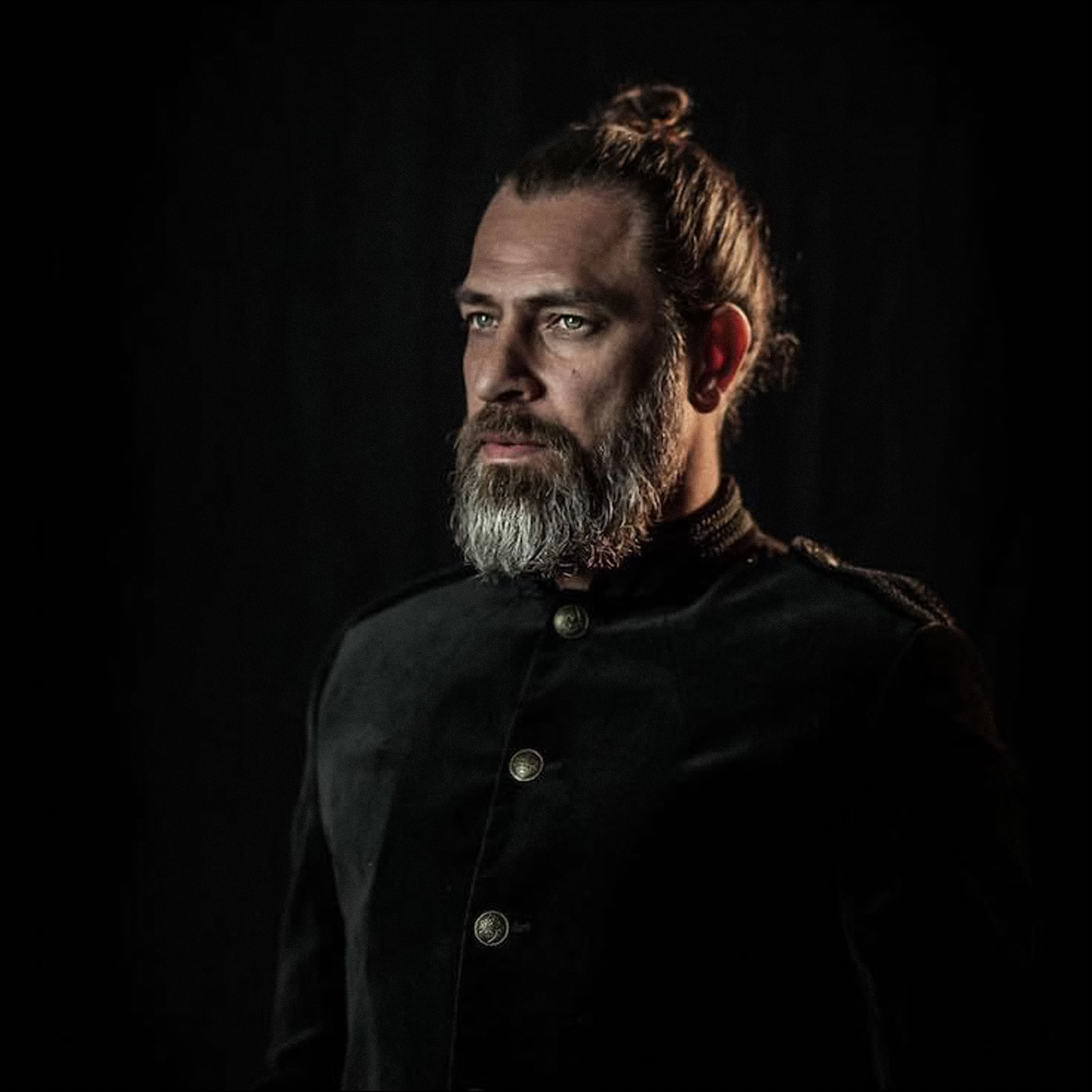
- Born: 20 December 1974 (age 51); Mashhad, Razavi Khorasan, Iran
- Education: Gerrit Rietveld Academie
- Occupations: Filmmaker, photographer, visual artist
- Years active: 2006–present

Mostafa Heravi (Persian: مصطفی هروی; born in 1974 in Mashhad, Iran) is an Iranian filmmaker, photographer, and visual artist. He is known for the films Sansur (2023), and It was 5 in the Morning. He grew up in Iran and moved to the Netherlands in 2000, where he graduated from the Gerrit Rietveld Academie.

== Early life ==
Mostafa Heravi was born in 1974 in Mashhad, Iran. He was raised in a conservative and religious family where he was encouraged from an early age to take up drawing, reciting the Quran, and calligraphy. Heravi studied painting under the artists Hossein Talebi and Amir Khajehamiri.

He developed a passion for music in childhood but was unable to pursue it due to his circumstances and focused on painting instead. While living in Mashhad, he and his friend ran a hair salon to support their painting pursuits. Later, he moved to Tehran to explore theatre and photography. After entering university to study cinema and film-making, he began to focus seriously on those artistic pursuits that would later constitute his career.

Heravi received a degree in Audiovisual art from the Gerrit Rietveld Academie of Amsterdam.

== Career ==
=== Music videos ===
Heravi worked at the Radio Zamaneh studio from 2006 to 2010. He later worked as a filmmaker, photographer, and visual artist in Amsterdam. Heravi's work is known for its critical approach to society.

In 2009, he started to make music videos, the first of which was for exiled, avant-garde Iranian singer Mohsen Namjoo, named "Gladiators". The video was considered unplayable by media outlets due to its content. Apart from his collaboration with Namjoo, Heravi has also made music videos for Shahin Najafi, another Iranian singer, songwriter, and political activist who is a noted critic of the Iranian regime.

In 2011, he produced a music video for the rock band Khak named "Tanham Nazar" (Don't Leave Me Alone). Mostafa Heravi is the director of photography of the 2012 "Kiosk: A Generation Destroyed by Madness." The work is a music documentary written and directed by Ala Mohseni and a review of approximately forty years of Iranian history after the Islamic revolution along with the Kiosk band tours. Heravi's first collaboration with Kiosk was in 2008, when he made the official music video for their version of Ay from bia (Persian: ای یارم بیا) which features Mohsen Namjoo as guest singer. Some shots from the video are borrowed from the surrealistic film The Color of Pomegranates by Armenian director Sergei Paradjanov.

He also directed "Bedrood" (Farewell) in 2016, a song by the Amsterdam-based band, Panida. In 2017, Mostafa Heravi directed a music video for Omid Noori, a pioneer of opera music in Afghanistan, called "Orouj" (Ascension), which depicts the Farkhunda Malikzada who was accused of burning the Quran. He has also made music videos for Majid Kazemi and Faarjam, among the other Iranian singers and bands.

=== Film director ===
- For his 2007 graduation project, Mostafa Heravi wrote and directed a short film (19 minutes) named Dawn (Persian: شفق). The film won several awards, including best Dutch students' movie of the year and the public award at the TENT Academy Awards in 2007. Dawn is a short film about a pub where only one customer notices all the changes. While the other customers keep to themselves, the Iranian man tries to tackle the problems of the café.
- It is written (Persian: کتیبه) is a short movie written and directed by Mostafa Heravi in 2006 featuring Leena Tolonen as dancer and actor. In the film, a woman in a chador dances to Iranian Rock/Folk musician Farhad Mehrad's song: Katibeh. The movie shows how it would look if a woman were allowed to live freely in a patriarchal society. It was screened at Women's Voices Now (WVN) theme of which was "Women's Voices from the Muslim World: A Short Film Festival" and won second place in Experimental section.
- Mostaghim Tahe Khat (Persian: مستقیم ته خط) is the name of an independent 2017 Sunday show produced by Mostafa Heravi, initially broadcast on YouTube. In each weekly episode which lasted about 30 minutes, Heravi interviewed a featured guest (an Iranian artist or journalist) about the matter while driving in the streets to host the show. Hamed Ahmadi as the head writer, Soroush Mehrani as the cameraman, and Faarjam Saeedi as the composer are the other co-creators of the program. The project was discontinued after 13 episodes due to lack of a sponsor.
- It Was 5 in the Morning (Persian: ساعت ۵ صبح بود) is a 2018 Iranian film directed, written, and edited by Mostafa Heravi. It features Iranian artists who address the death penalty practice in Iran through their art, including Shahin Najafi, Mana Neyestani, Boshra Dastournezhad and Shabnam Tolouei, among others. The movie deals with the widespread use and practice of death penalty and public executions which often happen at five o’clock in the morning, which is the reason behind the naming of the movie. The film begins with a song from the snow-covered forest. Every one of the actors narrates their stories of the death penalty in Iran. A small wooden stool resembling an execution acts as a bridge throughout the movie to connect each episode to the other. The final shot of the movie was recorded in sheer silence. It depicted Gohar Eshghi sitting still on the same stool along with the mother of Sattar Beheshti, an Iranian worker and blogger arrested for his online writing, in detention and then killed under torture.

=== Technical Editor ===
- Hayedeh: Legendary Persian Diva (Persian: سخن از هایده) is a 2009 documentary film about the late Iranian singer Hayedeh, directed by Pejman Akbarzadeh in the Netherlands. Heravi edited this movie in collaboration with Gregory Macousi. Hayedeh was released on 20 January 2010, the 20th death anniversary of Hayedeh. The DVD was released by Persian Dutch Network in Amsterdam.

=== Visual arts and photography ===
As a visual artist, Heravi also works in photography. His work has been exhibited in galleries in the United States and the Netherlands.

Heravi has published photography projects focusing on women and social themes, which have received attention through social media platforms. His work often incorporates political and pop culture imagery to comment on contemporary issues.

In October 2015, his photography was presented at The Road Ahead festival, organized by Zamaneh Foundation in Amsterdam, alongside a 10-minute video reflecting on Iranian influencers and social media culture.

In May and June 2019, Heravi exhibited at the Stories for Freedom Festival in Rotterdam, alongside other Iranian artists including Hamed Ahmadi (writer), Shahyar Ghanbari (poet), Sahand Sahebdivani (storyteller), and Faarjam (musician).

The recurring subjects of his work include women’s rights, religion, and sociopolitical issues.
