= Dadehbala =

Dadehbala may refer to:

- Masoumeh Dadehbala (1942-1990), commonly known as Hayedeh, an Iranian singer
- Eftekhar Dadehbala (1946-2007), commonly known as Mahasti, an Iranian singer.
