= Bijan Samandar =

Iranian poet, lyricist, and Tar player (1941–2019)

Bijan Samandar بیژن سمندر
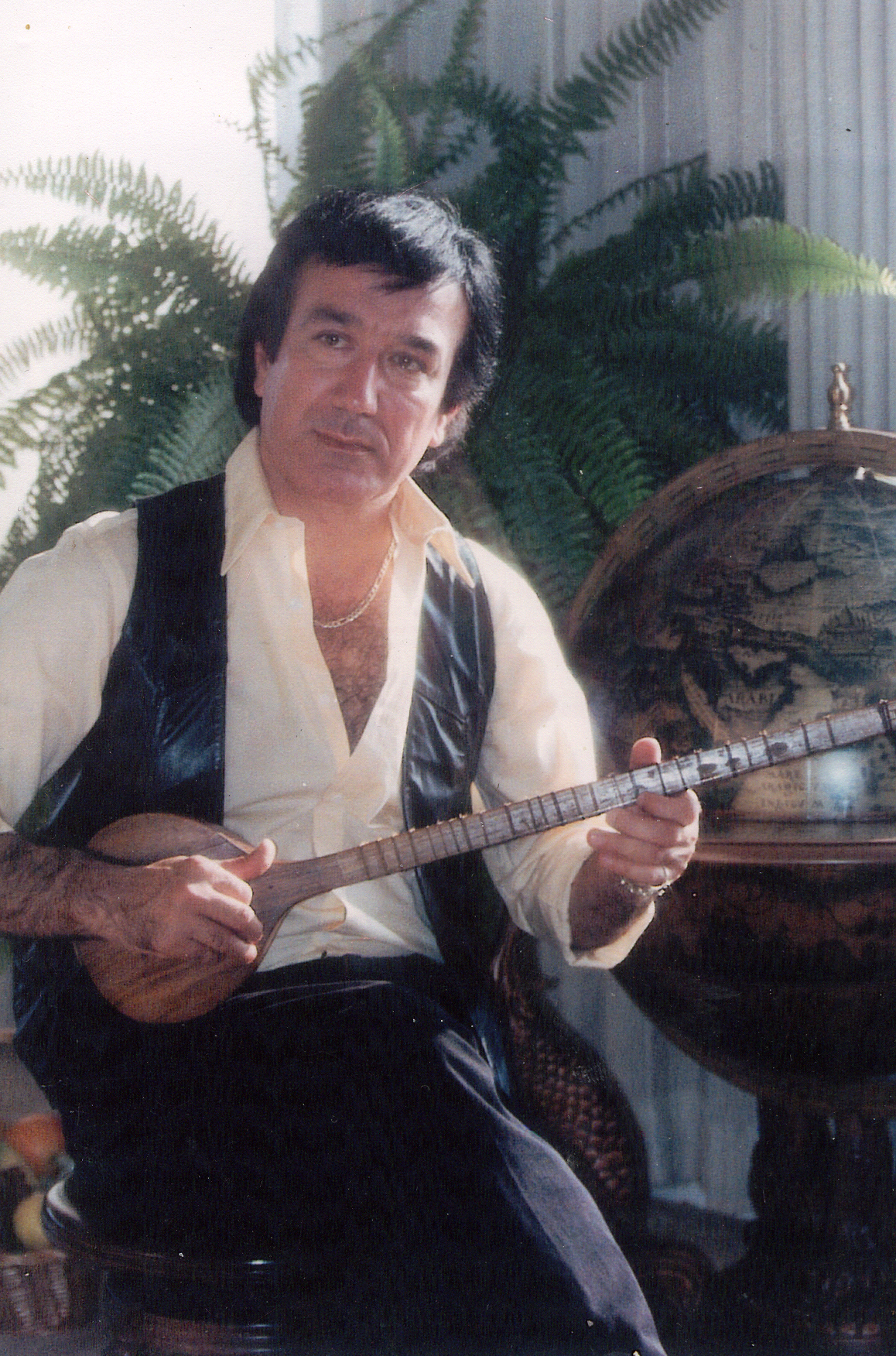

Background information
- Born: Bijan Samandar; June 1, 1941; Shiraz, Iran
- Died: January 8, 2019 (aged 77) Santa Monica, California, U.S.
- Occupations: Poet, Lyricist
- Instrument: Tar
- Years active: 1969–2003

Bijan Samandar (June 1, 1941 – January 8, 2019; Persian: بیژن سمندر) was a prominent Iranian contemporary poet, lyricist and Tar player who has written lyrics for notable artists including Ebi, Dariush, Sattar, Vigen, Moein, Mahasti, Shahram Shabpareh, Andy, Homeyra, Morteza, Hassan Shamaizadeh, and many more.

== Life ==
Born in Shiraz in 1941, he studied architecture in the United States and for a while worked with the Iranian Embassy in Washington DC. In the 1970s, he returned to Tehran and worked with the national TV. After 1979 revolution Samandar moved to California.

Died on January 6, 2019, after a long battle with Parkinson's disease being cared for in a residential care facility in Santa Monica, CA.

== Work ==
Samandar tar albums have been released in the United States in 1970s as LP. Later in Tehran and Los Angeles his lyrics have been performed by most famous Persian singers such as Hayedeh, Mahasti, Ebi, Martik and Moein.

A collection of his poems is published in Shiraz entitled "Shiraz-e Az Gol Beytaru".
