= Macan Band =

Iranian band

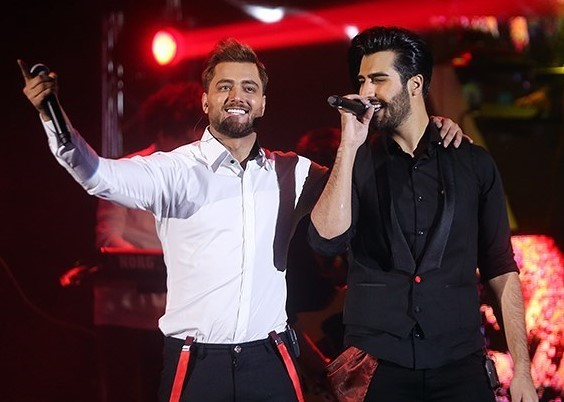
- Macan Band in 2017; from right to left: Raham Hadian and Amir Magare

Background information
- Genres: Iranian pop
- Years active: 2016–Now
- Label: Avazi No
- Members: Roham Hadian; Amir Magareh

Macan Band (Persian: ماکان بند) is an Iranian pop formed in 2017. The band's vocalists are Roham Hadian and Amir Maghare. The band debuted in 2017 and quickly achieved success.

The group's first single, "Baroon" was released in 2017 and was widely acclaimed. The song "Baroon" was later included in the group's first album, Divooneh Bazi. The group reached its peak of popularity with the single "Har Bar In Daro." The group received the Golden Statuette for the Best Pop Song from the People's Choice Award at the 5th Annual Music Festival in 2018 for the song "Yeh Lahzeh Negam Kon."

== Members ==
- Roham Hadian (رهام هادیان) - vocalist
- Amir Maghare (امیر مقاره) - vocalist

== Discography ==
=== Albums ===
Divooneh Bazi (2017)
No.	Title	Lyrics	Music	Arrangement	Length
1	Naro	Macan Band		Amirnilad Nikzad	2:59
2	Shik	Arash Adl Parvar		Amirnilad Nikzad	3:03
3	Ba To Aromam	Macan Band		Amirnilad Nikzad	2:40
4	Cheshaye To	Arash Adl Parvar		Amirnilad Nikzad	3:32
5	Panjereh	Macan Band	Macan Band	Amirnilad Nikzad	3:17
6	Bazicheh	Macan Band	Macan Band	Amirnilad Nikzad	3:04
7	Divooneh Bazi	Macan Band	Macan Band	Anooshirvan Taghavi	2:40
8	Ey Dad	Macan Band	Macan Band	Amirnilad Nikzad	3:09
9	Mesle Kooh	Macan Band	Macan Band	Amirnilad Nikzad	3:06
10	In Khiaboona	Mahshad Arab	Macan Band	Amirnilad Nikzad	3:31
11	Baroon	Macan Band	Macan Band	Amirnilad Nikzad	4:09
12	Har Bar In Daro	Macan Band - Mahshad Arab	Macan Band	Amirnilad Nikzad	3:11

Naghashi (2022)
No.	Title	Lyrics	Music	Arrangement	Length
1	Ase Ase	Shaghayegh Amirazdi	Aroon Afshar	Mehrshad Khalaj	2:48
2	Bi Taghalob	Donya Kondori	Pedram Paliz	Hamed Baradaran & Arash Navaei	3:14
3	Bi Chatr	Raham Hadian	Raham Hadian	Salar Noorani	3:13
4	Hala Ke Oomadi	Amir Maghare	Amir Maghare	Mehrshad Khalaj	3:14
5	Naghashi	Amir Maghare	Amir Maghare	Amirnilad Nikzad & Ehsan Ahmadi	3:24
6	Zemestoon	Raham Hadian	Raham Hadian	Mehrshad Khalaj	3:52
7	Dooset Daram	Shaghayegh Amirazdi	Aroon Afshar	Mehrshad Khalaj	3:15
8	Hagh Bedeh	Amir Maghare	Raham Hadian	Ehsan Ahmadi	3:51
9	Khab Boodam	Amir Maghare	Amir Maghare & Pedram Paliz	Ehsan Ahmadi	2:32
10	Gardanam Bendaz	Raham Hadian	Raham Hadian	Amirnilad Nikzad	3:53
11	Sadegiat	Amir Maghare	Amir Maghare	Ehsan Ahmadi	2:47
12	Nadidam	Amir Maghare	Amir Maghare	Hamed Baradaran & Arash Navaei	2:43
13	Bia	Amir Maghare	Amir Maghare	Amirnilad Nikzad	3:03
14	Film	Raham Hadian	Raham Hadian	Ehsan Ahmadi	2:56
15	Doregard	Raham Hadian	Raham Hadian	Amirnilad Nikzad	3:26
16	Heif	Amir Maghare	Amir Maghare	Amirnilad Nikzad	4:22

=== Extended plays ===
EP (2024)
No.	Title	Lyrics	Music	Arrangement	Mix	Length
1	Bavare Man	Amir Maghare	Amir Maghare	Ehsan Ahmadi	Ehsan Ahmadi	3:26
2	Be Ensafi	Roham Hadian	Roham Hadian	Milad Akbari	Milad Akbari	3:05
3	Dorahi	Amir Maghare	Amir Maghare	Ehsan Ahmadi	Ehsan Ahmadi	3:39
4	Toofan	Amir Maghare	Amir Maghare	Amirnilad Nikzad	Ehsan Ahmadi	7:17
