= Mohammad Nouri =

Mohammad Nouri may refer to:

- Mohammad Nouri (singer), Iranian folk and pop singer
- Mohammad Nouri (footballer), Iranian footballer
- Mahamat Nouri, Chadian insurgent leader
