= Hooshmand Aghili =

Iranian singer (1937–2025)

Hooshmand Aghili هوشمند عقیلی
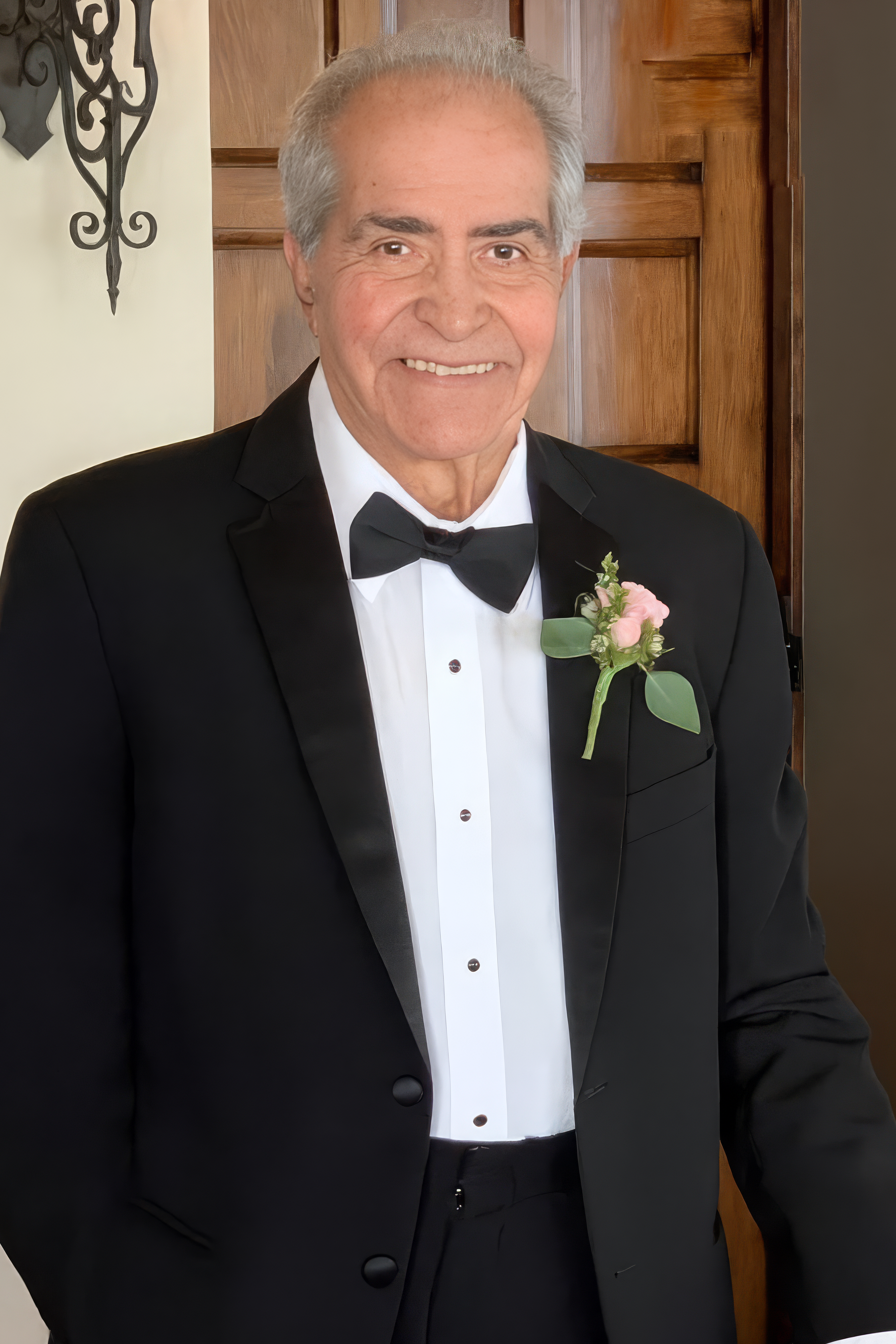
- Hooshmand Aghili at Daughter's Wedding

Background information
- Born: 25 July 1937; Isfahan, Iran
- Died: 4 September 2025 (aged 88) Los Angeles, California, U.S.
- Genres: Pop music, classical music
- Years active: 1972–2011

Hooshmand Aghili (Persian: هوشمند عقیلی; 25 July 1937 – 4 September 2025) was an Iranian singer known for classical and popular Persian songs. He is best known for his song “Farda To Miaei” (also spelled Farda to Miayee).

Born in Isfahan, Aghili trained as a teenager with the classical singer Taj Esfahani and performed early in his career on Radio Isfahan. He later continued his studies in Tehran, appeared on National stages, and sang with the National Orchestra after the launch of Iranian National Television, working with composers and musicians of the period.

His professional singing career gained wider recognition from the early 1970s. He became known for songs such as “Farda To Miyaee”, “Cheraghe Khooneh” and “Darya”. In 1977 he moved to the United States.

Aghili served as one of ten Honorary Judges of the 2005 contest The Search for the Star Musician of Iran, held to identify gifted amateur vocalists and musicians performing Persian traditional music and Iranian folk music. Following the death of Iranian singer Hayedeh, Aghili performed Hayedeh's Sarab as a tribute.

Aghili died on 4 September 2025, at the age of 88.

== Discography ==
=== Studio albums ===
- Farda Tou Miyaee – 1974 Caspian
- Eshghe Sharghi – 1980 Soundex, Caltex Records
- Agar – 1983 Caspian
- Yeki Ra Doust Midaram (feat. Hayedeh & Mahasti) – 1983 Taraneh
- Renge Rahat – 1984 Caspian
- Behtarin (feat. Sattar & Hayedeh) – 1984 Caspian, Caltex Records
- Khatereh 5 (feat. Mahasti, Hayedeh & Sadegh Nojouki) – 1986 Caltex Records
- Faal – 1988 Pars Video
- Darya – Persian Music 1989 Caltex Records
- Che Khabar Az Iran – 1990 Pars Video
- Yar – Persian Music 1992 Caltex Records
- Parastoohaye Mosafer – 1994 Taraneh Records
- Dokhtarekeh Faal Been – 1998 Pars Video
- Live in Concert – 2000 Pars Video
- Jamal e Janan – 2007 Pars Video
