= Adhami =

Adhami is a surname. Notable people with the surname include:

- Loghman Adhami (born 1949), Iranian violinist and composer
- Vangjel Adhami (born 1948), Albanian chess master

== See also ==
- Adami (surname)
- Adham
