= Mohammad Nouri (singer) =

Mohammad Hedayat Nouri
- Born: Mohammad Nouri; 22 December 1929; Rasht, Imperial State of Persia
- Died: 31 July 2010 (aged 80) Rasht, Iran
- Genres: Persian music Classical music
- Occupations: Composer, singer
- Years active: 1942–2010
- Website: Facebook Fanpage

Mohammad Nouri (Persian: محمد نوری, December 22, 1929 – July 31, 2010) was one of the foremost folk and pop singers in Iran. Before the 1979 Iranian Revolution, Nouri was relatively unknown among Iranian pop music lovers mainly because his string orchestral pop tunes hardly fit for disco and party entertainment, not to mention little exposure and publicity efforts on his part. Some of his most famous songs include "Jaan-e Maryam," "Galaxy of Love," and "Iran Iran."

== Biography ==
Nouri studied English Language and Literature at the University of Tehran, but continued his professional career in music. He studied Persian music under Esmaeil Mehrtash and music theory and piano under Sirous Shahrdar and Fereidoun Farzaneh. In his singing style he was considered as a follower of Hossein Aslani and Naser Hosseini.

His song Jaan-e Maryam, Gol-e Maryam (جان مریم، گل مریم), as well as his patriotic songs such as Journeys for the Fatherland and Iran, Iran, have been and are well known melodies and themes among three generations of Iranians from both before and after the 1979 Iranian Revolution. Also, Nouri had many notable students, including Sahar Moghadass and Reza Shirmarz.

== See also ==
- Music of Iran
- List of Iranian musicians
