= Loghman Adhami =

Iranian violinist and composer

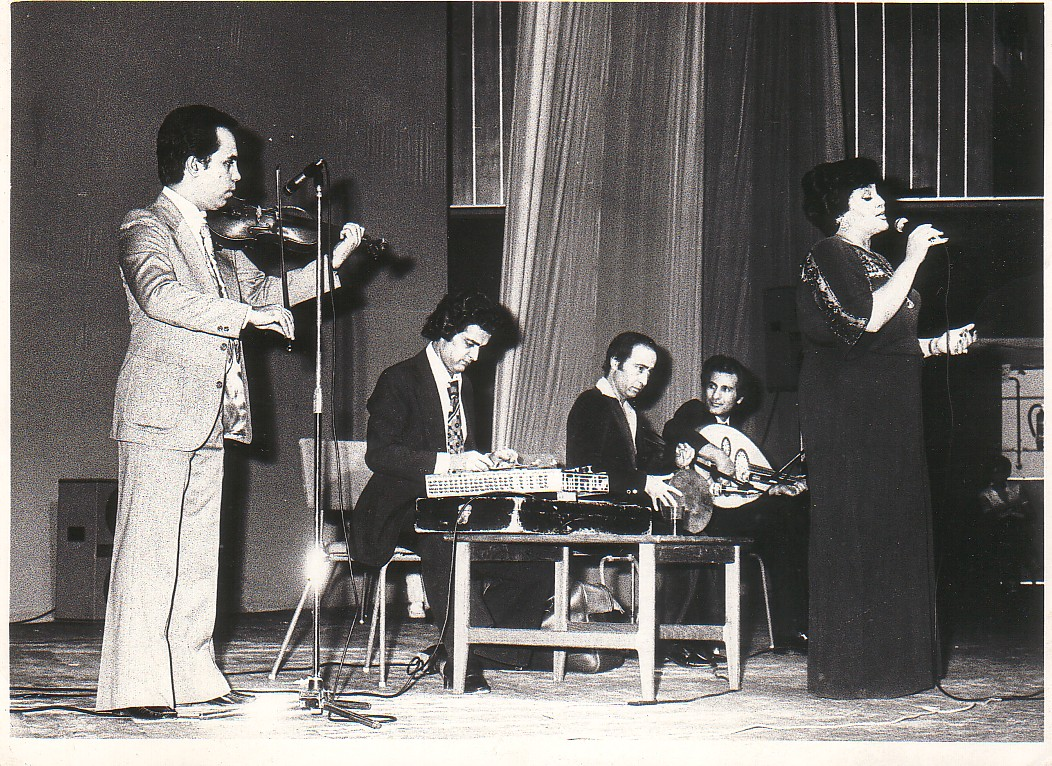
Loghman Adhami performing with the renowned Iranian singer Hayedeh in the 1970s in Iran.

Loghman Adhami (born 1949) is an Iranian violinist and composer.

== Biography ==
Adhami was born in 1949 in Tehran, Iran. From the age of 7, he began playing the violin and composing at age 15. He studied under prominent Iranian and international musicians, such as Parviz Yahaghi, Ali Tajvidi, Manuel Compensky, George Martiroussian and Ronald Konieszica.

Adhami holds a B.A. in music from the School of Arts in Tehran and an M.Sc. from the University of Cincinnati – College-Conservatory of Music. Adhami's musical training includes the Iranian violin technique, the Persian modal (dastgah) system, western classical composition and theory, and classical violin technique.

Since the 1970s, Loghman Adhami has performed, composed and arranged numerous songs for leading Iranian singers, notably Ebi Hamedi, Fereydoon Farrokhzad, Mahasti, Hayedeh, Hassan Sattar, Homeyra and Leila Forouhar. Also, he has had extensive collaborations with the Iranian lyricists Tooraj Negahban and Faregh Amiri. Many of these works have developed since his immigration to the United States in the wake of the 1979 Iranian Revolution. In the United States, Adhami has released four hit albums: Javedaneh (violin solo), Ashk (violin and orchestra), Golrang (violin and orchestra) and Shomal (violin and piano).

In addition to the violin, Adhami plays the Persian kamanche, tar, oud, ney and tonbak.

Since 1993, he has owned and operated the International Music School in Costa Mesa, California, an academy that employs a diverse teaching staff to offer music lessons in various instruments from around the world. Adhami also hosts a biweekly radio program dedicated to the study of Iranian and world music on 670 AM KIRN in Los Angeles.
