= Martik =

Iranian Armenian singer

Martik مارتیک قره‌خانیان Մարտիկ
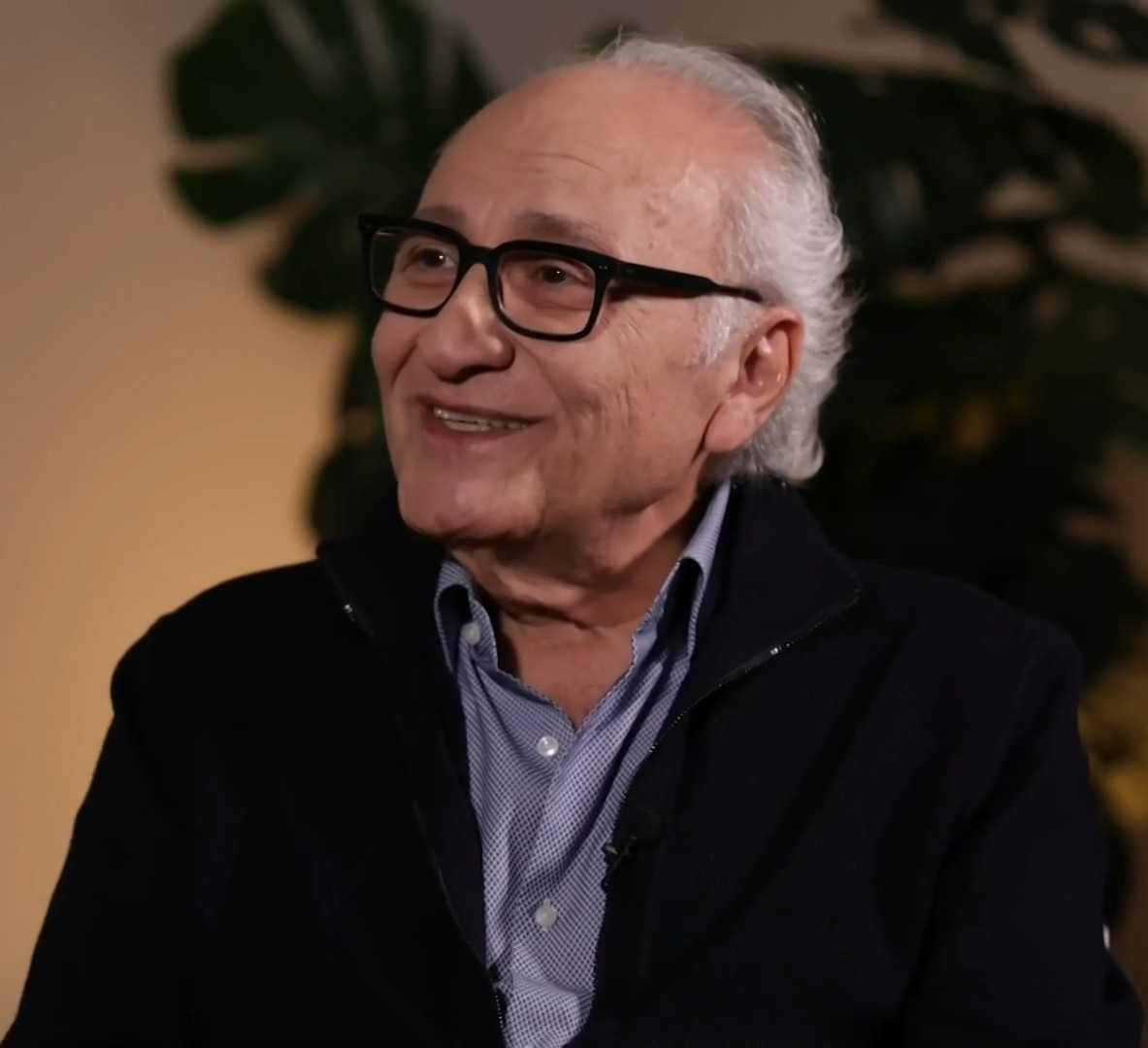
- Martik VOA Farsi Interview, 2024

Background information
- Born: Martik Qarah Khanian; 17 July 1949 (age 77); Abadan, Iran
- Genres: Rock, pop, blues
- Occupations: Guitarist, singer, composer
- Instruments: Vocals, guitar
- Years active: 1970–present
- Labels: Caltex Records, Pars Video, Taraneh Enterprises Inc, OF-OZ Records, Sole Records, Avang
- Website: www.martikmusic.com

Martik Qarah Khanian (Persian: مارتیک قره‌خانیان; born 17 July 1949), known mononymously as Martik (Armenian: Մարտիկ), is an Iranian Armenian singer, composer, arranger, and guitarist based in the United States. Martik has performed in various musical styles, including pop, rock, ballad, fusion, and dance.

== Early life and career ==
Martik Gharakhanian was born on 17 July 1949 in the Farahabad neighborhood of Abadan, Iran. He spent his childhood in Abadan and has two sisters and one brother. At the age of 15, he developed an interest in music. After his father retired from the National Iranian Oil Company, the family relocated to Tehran, where Martik began his professional career as a guitarist, performing foreign songs.

In the late 1960s, Martik joined Googoosh's orchestra as a regular guitarist. He later ventured into composing and singing. His melodies were influenced by rock and rhythm and blues (R&B). His first composition, Chelcheleh, was released in early 1975, with lyrics by Zoya Zakarian, then a relatively new lyricist, and performed by Hassan Shamaizadeh. Martik’s debut as a Persian-language singer was with the song Harir, also written by Zoya Zakarian, which established him as a notable vocalist. After transitioning to performing Persian songs and collaborating with artists like Googoosh and Hassan Shamaizadeh in songwriting, performances, and television programs such as Panjereh, he quickly gained public recognition. He released his first album in 1977.

Before the 1979 Iranian Revolution, Martik traveled to London, where he performed as a guitarist with an Italian orchestra at the Hilton Hotel. He briefly returned to Iran before the revolution but left the country in 1980, settling in Los Angeles, United States. In an interview with Manoto TV, Martik mentioned that he had considered returning to Iran years earlier.

Due to his Western-influenced musical style, Martik initially struggled to gain widespread popularity in the 1980s compared to artists like Moein, Ebi and Dariush Eghbali. Over time, he adapted his style, with songs such as Bahar, Mah, To Nashnidi Sedat Kardam, and Do Delbar, composed by renowned Iranian composer Sadegh Nojouki, significantly boosting his popularity.

In addition to his continued collaboration with Zoya Zakarian, Martik worked with prominent post-revolution lyricists, including Jaklin Derderian, Masoud Fardmanesh, Jahanshakh Pazouki, Bijan Samandar, Homa Mirafshar, Ardalan Sarfaraz, Shahyar Ghanbari, and Iraj Jannati Ataei. Alongside composing his own songs, he collaborated with distinguished composers such as Hassan Shamaizadeh, Siavash Ghomayshi, Mohammad Heydari, Sadegh Nojouki, Farid Zoland, and Manouchehr Cheshmazar.

His most recent album, Sayehneshin, was released in February 2015.

After a long hiatus, Martik performed a live concert on September 27, 2025 at the Dolby Theatre in Los Angeles. He is also scheduled to perform a series of concerts throughout the United States in November 2025.

== Discography ==
=== Studio albums ===
- Harir (Martik 1), 1977 Avang
- Toro Yadam Nemireh, 1983 OF-OZ Records
- Refaghat, 1986 Taraneh Enterprises Inc
- Parandeh, 1987 Taraneh Enterprises Inc
- Niloofar (Setareh), 1989 Taraneh Enterprises Inc
- Khab - Complication, 1990 Taraneh Enterprises Inc
- Harir - Complication, 1991 Taraneh Enterprises Inc
- Bahaar, 1991 Caltex Records
- Mehmoon (with Shohreh), 1993 Caltex Records
- Sadaf Va Sang, 1994 Taraneh Enterprises Inc
- Hoosa, 1995 Taraneh Enterprises Inc (Armenian Album)
- Navaye Eshgh, 1996 Nava Entertainment
- Atreh Lahzeha, 1997 Taraneh Enterprises Inc
- Ba Shoma, 2002 Caltex Records
- Sayehneshin, 2015 Sole Records

=== Singles ===
- Pastime Paradise, 1976
- Gharghabeye Dard, 1976
- Jadeye Sabz, 1976
- Sha'er (feat. Googoosh), 1976
- Adam O Havva (feat. Googoosh), 1978
- Sirelis, 1984
- Karotic, 1984
- Cheshme Tou, 1987 (on Album Tanine Solh)
- Faghat Tou, 1994 (on Album Khaneh Ashegh Koojast)
- Negahe Tou (feat. Helen), 2003
- Ba Tou Bad Nistam, 2008
- Ghalbe Man, 2008
- Doostam Dashteh Bash, 2008
- Windmills Of Your Mind, 2017
- Refaghat (feat. Googoosh), 2018
- Eshghe Kamyab (feat. Googoosh), 2019
- Asheghet Hastam (feat. Googoosh), 2019
- Shabe Bidad, 2021
- Donya Khanoom, 2022
- Baranak, 2023
- Haghighat, 2023
- Mara Bekhan, 2023
- Tahammolam Kon, 2024
- Khodamo Be Tou Sepordam, 2024

== See also ==
- List of Iranian musicians
- Music of Iran
- Persian pop music
- Rock and alternative music in Iran
