= Anoushiravan Rohani =

Iranian Accordion, pianist and songwriter

Anoushirvan Rohani
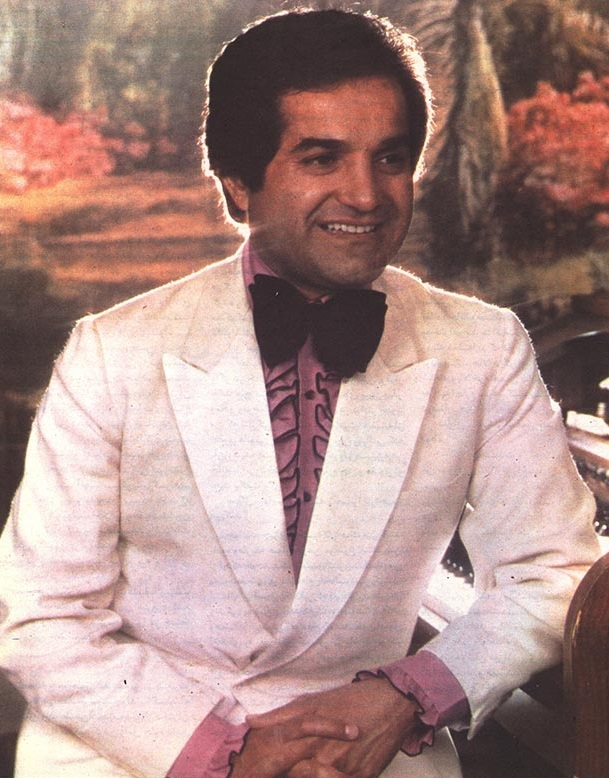
- Rohani in 1978

Background information
- Born: July 24, 1939 (age 86); Rasht, Iran
- Genres: Classical, pop, film music
- Occupations: Composer, pianist
- Instrument: Piano
- Years active: 1963–present
- Labels: Taraneh; Caltex; Avang Records/Avang; MZM Records; Catapult
- Website: www.anoushirvanrohani.com

Anoushiravan Rohani (Persian: انوشیروان روحانی; born July 24, 1939), also spelled Anooshiravan Rowhani, is an Iranian pianist and composer. He is known for composing and conducting contemporary classical music, as well as pop music with light classical leaning. He has also composed a number of scores to Iranian films.

== Early life ==
Born in Rasht, in the Gilan Province of Iran in 1939, Rohani received music lessons from his father, himself a poet and violinist. His brothers, Shahrdad Rohani, Ardeshir Rohani and Shahriar Rohani are also musicians. When Rohani was nine years old he had his first song broadcast on Iranian National Radio network.

Rohani later studied piano with pianist Javad Maroufi at the Persian National Music Conservatory in Tehran.

Besides piano, Rohani mastered the electronic organ and accordion. In 1958, Anoushirvan officially began his long collaboration with the National Iranian Radio. Rohani's career includes over 500 compositions that feature vocals, orchestral arrangements, piano pieces and film scores, among them "Soltan-e-Ghalbhaa", "Dele Kuchuloo," and "Gol-e-Sang."

== Later works ==
After the Iranian Revolution of 1979, Rohani continued his composing in the Western world, principally based in Los Angeles and Germany, where he recorded albums under the MZM record label.

Rohani worked with orchestras outside of Iran, including the Czech Symphony Orchestra in Prague, which performed the orchestral pieces from his album 'Symphonic Love Melodies.

In 2003, he wrote one song for Scorpions, Maybe I Maybe You, which features on the album Unbreakable.

== Discography ==
=== Studio albums ===
The albums listed below are from his post-revolutionary compositions:

- King of Hearts, 1968
- Faryaad, 1970, Catapult
- Tavalodet Mobarak (Happy Birthday), 1972, Catapult
- Soltan e Ghalbha (Emperor of Hearts), featuring Shahdad Rohani, 1982, Catapult
- Taraneh-e Saal, with Hayedeh and Moein, 1985, Catapult
- Yadgar-e Omr 1 (The Reminiscence of Life, Vol 1), 1992, Catapult
- Yadgar-e Omr 2 (The Reminiscence of Life, Vol 2), 1993, Catapult
- Bahaneh, with Leila Forouhar, 1993, Catapult
- Zolfaye Yaaram, with Sima Bina, 1993
- Oaj-e Seda, with Hayedeh and Mahasti, 1994, Catapult
- Mohebat, 1994, Catapult
- Rangaarang, 1972, Catapult
- Love Melodies (Symphonic), with the Czech Symphony Orchestra of Prague, 1997, Catapult

=== Compilation albums ===
- Scent of Yesterday, Vol 13, 2009
- Persian Odes (Chakameh-Haye Irani) Persian Old Songs, 2011
- Oud? CDs , 2011

== Legacy ==
Rohani composed the Persian equivalent of "Happy Birthday" entitled "Tavalodet Mobarak" (lit. "blessed be your birthday"). It is commonly sung at Persian birthday parties (dedicated to his nephew Shervin Shaffiy).

== See also ==
- List of birthday songs
- List of Iranian musicians
- Music of Iran
- Persian pop music
