= Taq Kasra: Wonder of Architecture =

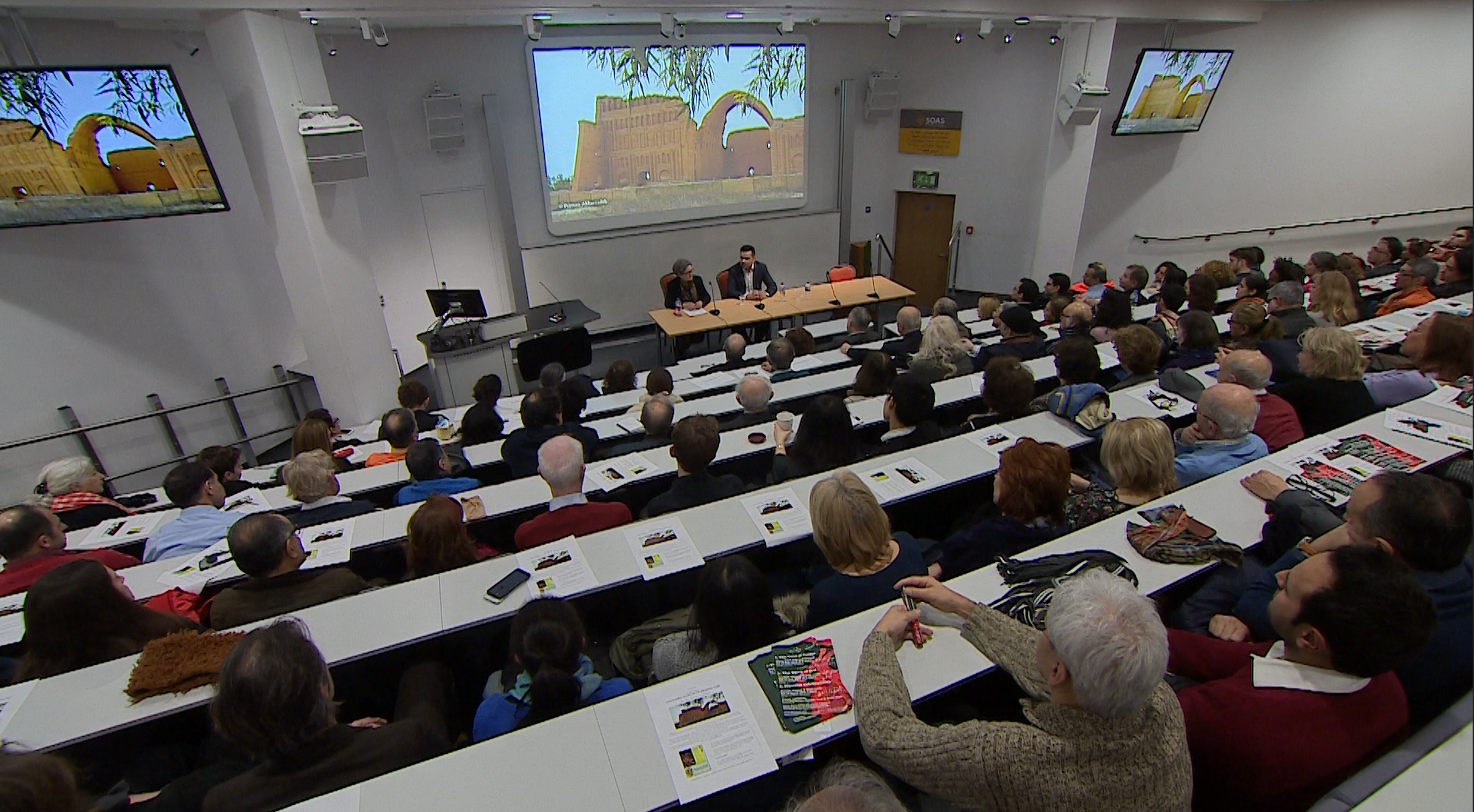
- Documentary premiere at SOAS, London
- Directed by: Pejman Akbarzadeh
- Produced by: Persian Dutch Network (Funded by Soudavar Memorial and Toos Foundation)
- Edited by: Arash Rezaeimehr
- Music by: Mohammad Shams
- Distributed by: Persian Dutch Network
- Release date: February 1, 2018
- Running time: 30 minutes
- Country: Netherlands
- Languages: English; Persian; German; Czech; Iraqi Arabic

Taq Kasra: Wonder of Architecture is a 2018 documentary film on the world's largest brick vault, Taq Kasra. It is the first film about this ancient Persian monument, directed by Pejman Akbarzadeh.

== Content ==
Taq Kasra was in danger of being destroyed by ISIS in 2015 - 2016, and this inspired Pejman Akbarzadeh to visit Iraq twice to film the arch and record its history.

The following scholars have been interviewed in the film

- Hossein Amanat (Persian-Canadian architect)
- Prof. Ed Keall (Former director of the Royal Ontario Museum’s Near Eastern Department)
- Prof. Touraj Daryaee (Director of Jordan Center for Persian Studies, Univ. of California)
- Dr. Ute Franke (State Museums of Berlin)
- Dr. Vesta Sarkhosh Curtis (British Museum)
- Dr. Ali Mozaffari (Australian Research Council, Deakin Univ.)
- Dr. Mahmoud Mullakhalaf (Iraqi Ambassador to UNESCO)
- Dr. Qais Huseen Rasheed (Head of Iraqi State Board of Antiquities)
- Dr. Miroslav Zeman (ProjektyZeman, Prague)
- Prof. Robert Hillenbrand (University Of Edinburgh)

The 30-minute documentary is filmed in Iraq, Persia/Iran, Canada, Britain, France, Germany, the Czech Republic, and the United States.

== Screenings ==
The documentary was premiered in February 2018 at SOAS, London and later screened at various conferences and museums such as the University of Pennsylvania Museum of Archaeology, 8th Conference of 'The Association for the Study of Persianate Societies' (ASPS), Smithsonian Institution's Freer Sackler Galleris of Art in Washington DC, and the National Gallery of Victoria, Melbourne.

Various North American universities, including the University of Texas and the University of Toronto, have streamed the film on their server for educational purposes.
