= Sahar (singer) =

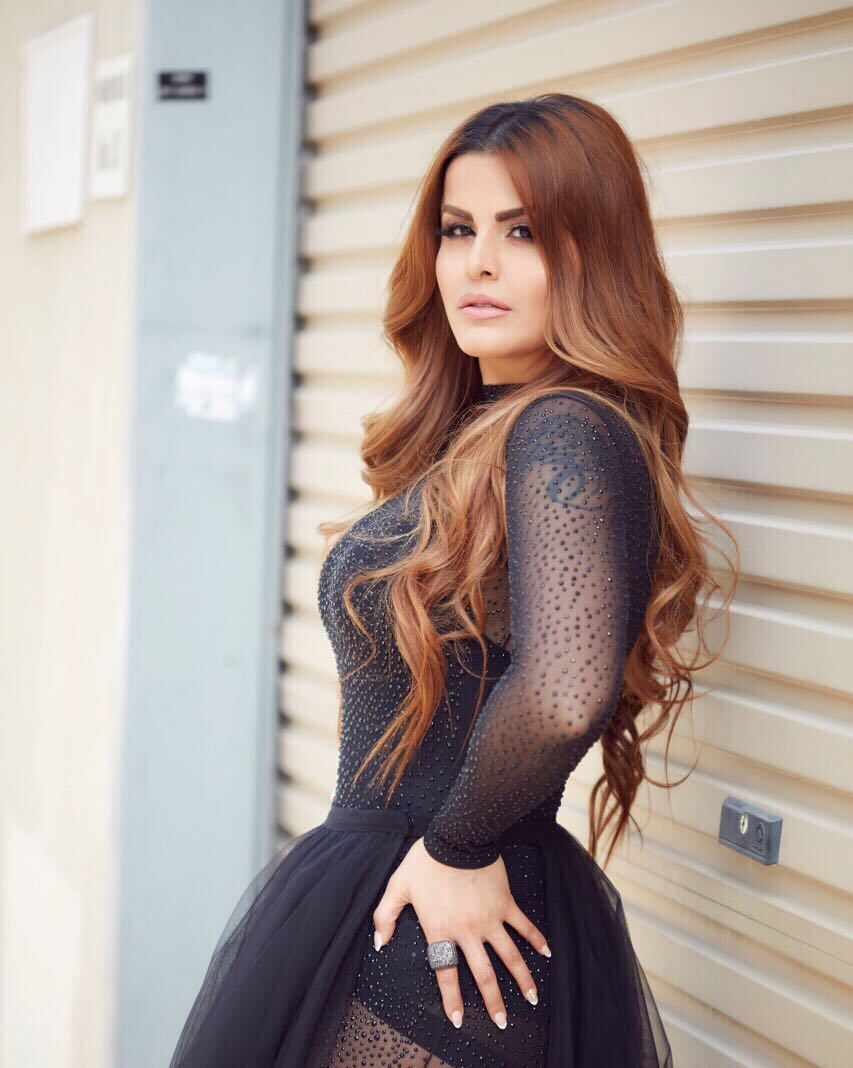
- Sahar in 2019

Background information
- Born: Sahar Moghadass; 4 December 1985 (age 40)
- Origin: Tehran, Iran
- Genres: Persian pop; dance-pop; electro-pop
- Occupations: Singer, actress
- Years active: 2002–present
- Labels: Avang, Radio Javan

Sahar Moghadass (Persian: سحر مقدس, born 4 December 1985), known mononymously as Sahar (Persian: سحر), is an Iranian singer, musician and dancer. She is known for her contributions to Persian pop music.

== Early life and education ==
Sahar Moghadass was born in Tehran, Iran. Her father was from Tehran, while her mother was from Semnan. Her grandfather is of Bulgarian origins. Sahar developed an interest in music at a precocious age. Her family encouraged her to pursue music and solfège classes with Iranian pop and folk music celebrity Mohammad Nouri. Sahar obtained a women's concert license from the Ministry of Culture and Islamic Guidance at the age of 17. Sahar obtained her Bachelor of Arts degree from the University of Tehran.

== Career ==
Sahar performed in women-only events under the Iranian government's sex segregation policy. In 2004, Sahar left Iran because of the performing restrictions and emigrated to the UAE where she obtained Emirati citizenship.

Sahar's international professional debut was in 2012 with the song "To Nabashi" [You Are Not], but she didn't achieve widespread notability until 2017. Sahar isn't married.

Her "Ey Vay" video has over 24 million views on YouTube as of February 2022, which made this video the most viewed music video on the Radio Javan Channel.

== Discography ==
=== EPs ===
Title and details
Almas
- Type: EP
- Released: 2021
Notes

No.	Title	Length
1.	"Almas"	2:57
2.	"Naro"	3:28
3.	"Del Roba"	3:17
4.	"Gharar"	3:02
5.	"Bavar"	3:45
6.	"Agha"	4:42

=== Singles ===
Title	Year
To Nabashi	2012
Maghroor	2012
Hess	2013
Khodahafez	2013
Dooset Daram	2014
Chi Shod Avaz Shodi	2014
Bedoone Man	2016
Yekam Yekam (Ft Sasy Mankan)	2016
Behtarin Mard	2016
Ey Vay	2016
Barf	2017
Ey Jan	2017
Boghz	2017
Khastam	2017
Faghat 10 Salete	2018
Che Haliye	2018
Shaame Romantic	2018
Azadi	2018
Lajbaz	2019
Ki Asheghet Karde	2019
Heif	2019
Do Nafare	2019
Del	2020
Mo Bi To	2020
Gharar	2020
Agha	2021
Khabari Nist	2021
Hey	2022
Yare Juni	2023
Tak Setarah	2024
Dokhte Sah	2024
