= Robert Hillenbrand =

British art historian

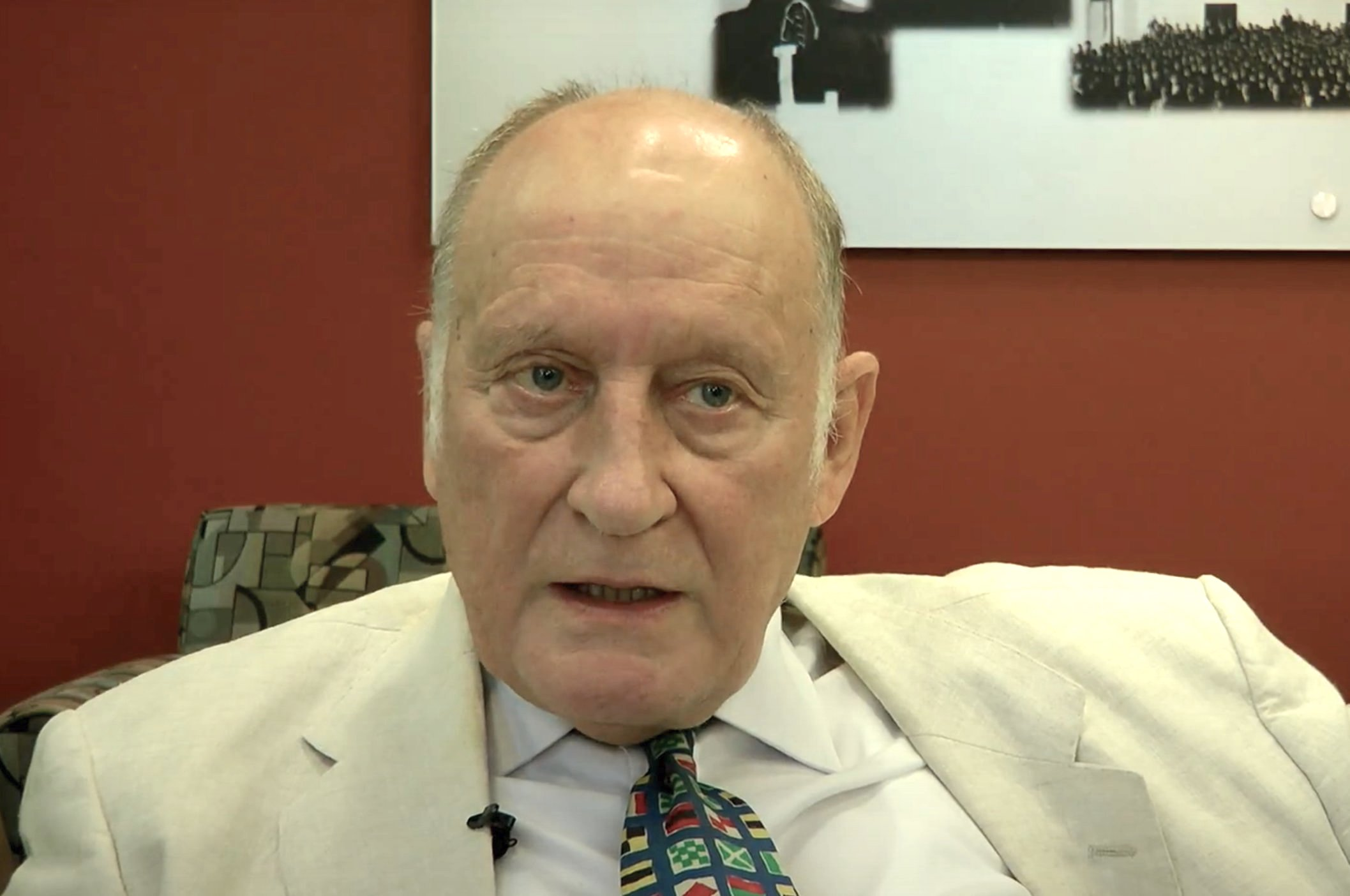
Robert Hillenbrand - British scholar of Persian art

Robert Hillenbrand FBA (born 2 August 1941) is a British art historian who specialises in Persian and Islamic art. He is a professorial fellow of the universities of Edinburgh and St Andrews. He was Slade Professor of Fine Art at the University of Cambridge for 2008–09. He gave the 2010 Aspects of Art Lecture.

In 2018 during the conference of the Association of Iranian Studies at the University of California, Irvine, the Lifetime Achievement Award was awarded Hillenbrand. In the same year he appeared in the documentary film Taq Kasra: Wonder of Architecture as a scholar of Sassanid Persia.

== Selected publications ==
- Imperial Images in Persian Painting
- Art and Archaeology of Ancient Persia (co-editor)
- Islamic Architecture in North Africa (co-author)
- Islamic Art and Architecture
- The Architecture of Ottoman Jerusalem: An Introduction
- Studies in Medieval Islamic Art and Architecture (2 vols.)
- Islamic Architecture. Form, Function and Meaning (translated into Persian in 1998)

== Curated Exhibition ==
- Imperial images of Persian painting : a Scottish Arts Council exhibition (1977)
