= Pejman Akbarzadeh =

Dutch-Iranian pianist (born 1980)

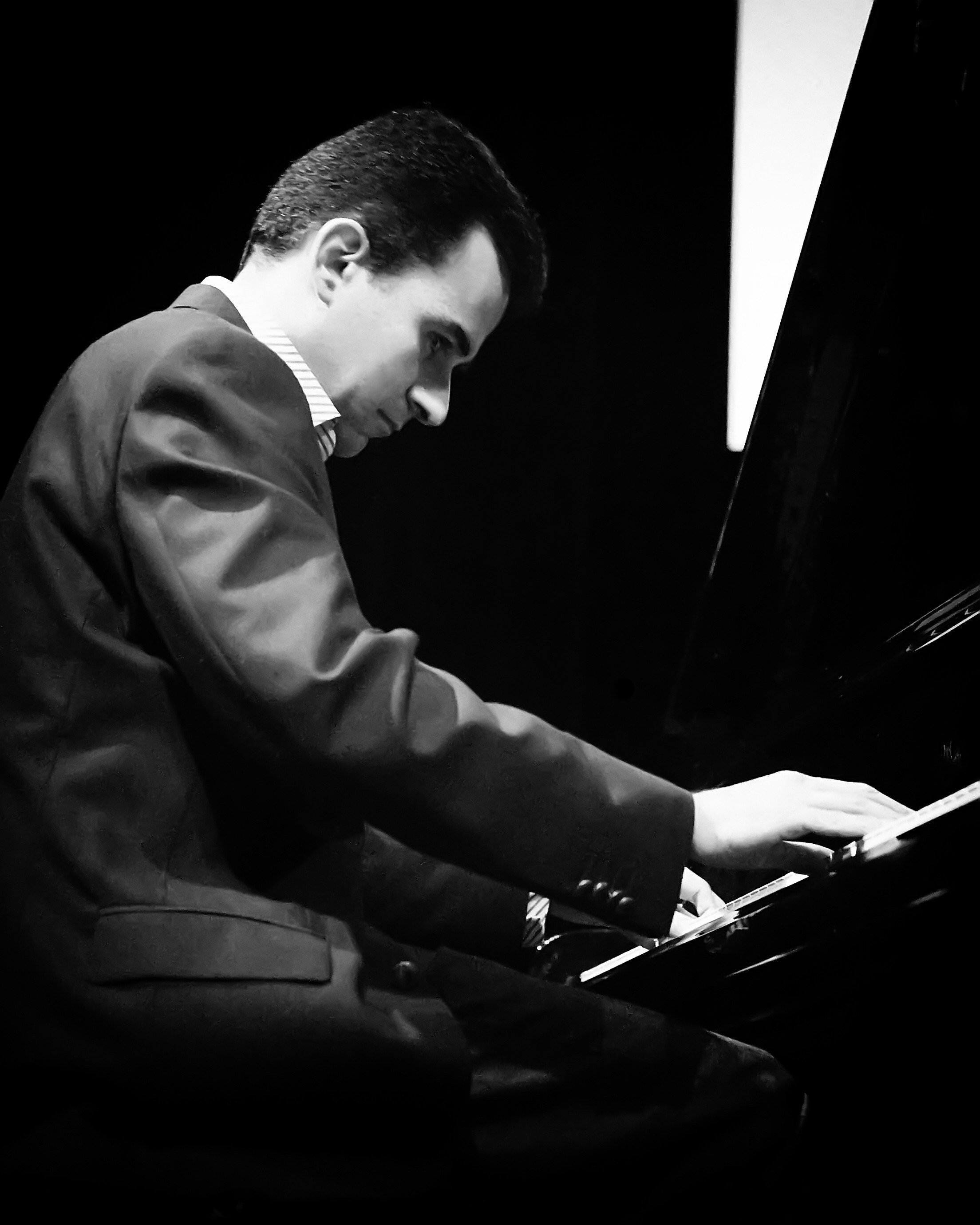
- Pejman Akbarzadeh, Tropentheater, Amsterdam, 2009
- Born: 1980 (age 45–46); Shiraz, Iran
- Occupations: Pianist, journalist, producer

Pejman Akbarzadeh (Persian: پژمان اكبرزاده, born 1980) is a Persian-Dutch pianist, journalist, music historian and documentary maker.

== Early life ==
Born in Shiraz in 1980, Akbarzadeh had his first music lessons at the age of nine from Gholam Loghmani and later from Bahram Nasrollahi. In 2001, he moved to Tehran and continued his piano studies under Farman Behboud.

== "Persian Musicians" project ==
At age fifteen he started to research the works and activities of twentieth-century Persian (Iranian) composers and conductors. Three years later he published the first volume of his projected four-volume work, Persian Musicians which became a source for various publications such as Encyclopedia Iranica.

== Journalism ==
Pejman Akbarzadeh (L) and Prof. Ahmad Eghtedari (R). Persian Studies Foundation Conference, Hafez Hall, Shiraz, 2005.

Pejman Akbarzadeh has written articles in both Persian and English, mostly on cultural topics, which have been published in BBC Persian Service Online, "Persian Heritage Magazine" (New Jersey), "Shargh Newspaper" (Tehran), "Rahavard Quarterly" (Los Angeles), "Gooya.com" (Brussels), "Payvand.com" (San Francisco)... and Yas-e-no Daily, which was banned in Iran in 2003.

== Persian Gulf studies ==
From 2002 to 2006 Akbarzadeh was the representative of Persian Gulf Online organization in Tehran. He has published various articles about this waterway in both English and Persian. He also lectured at the Persian Studies Foundation conference in Shiraz and Iranian Artists Forum in Tehran. The text of most of these lectures were published in "Shargh" daily.

== Move to the Netherlands ==
In 2006, Akbarzadeh moved to the Netherlands, citing restrictions on musical life and freedom of speech in Iran. For seven years he was a senior producer at Radio Zamaneh in Amsterdam. Currently he contributes to BBC Persian TV and website.

In March 2008, he performed the first Persian piano recital in Amsterdam. The sold-out concert at Bethanienklooster resulted in further invitations to perform in Europe. In August 2008 Pejman dedicated his recital at the University of Cologne to Ahmad Batebi, symbol of pro-democracy movement of Tehran University students, who fled to the United States after nine years of imprisonment in the same year. In 2012 he performed at Royal Concertgebouw in Amsterdam.

In 2008, Pejman also finished the first documentary about the legendary Persian diva Hayedeh who died in exile in 1990. The film premiered on 24 January 2009 in Amsterdam and nominated as the "best documentary" at Noor Iranian Film Festival in Los Angeles. In the same year Pejman Akbarzadeh introduced Persian piano music at the Netherlands' Radio 5 (OBA Show) and in 2012 at Amsterdam Concertgebouw.

In summer 2009, following the pro-freedom demonstrations in Iran which turned to blood, Pejman Akbarzadeh joined the solidarity events in Europe with the people of his homeland; Performing at Holland's Iranian Artists Eve in Amsterdam, "International Solidarity Conference with Iran's Students" at the University of Delft, Human Rights and Press Freedom Conference at Amsterdam's Tropen Theatre and cooperation with UNITED4IRAN demonstrations were among them.

== Works ==
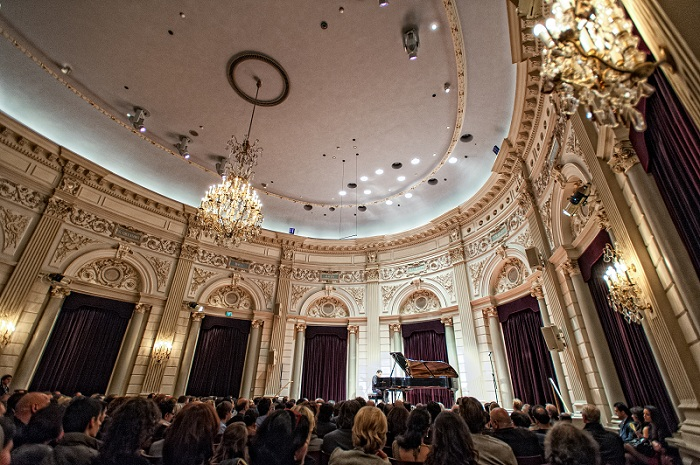
Pejman Akbarzadeh's recital at Amsterdam Concertgebouw, 2012.

Book

- Persian Musicians Volume 1 (Moosighidanane Irani, Jelde 1). Navid Publications, Shiraz/Tehran, 2000.
- Persian Musicians Volume 2 (Moosighidanane Irani, Jelde 2). Roshanak Publications, Tehran, 2002, ISBN 964-93867-3-4
- Persian Musicians Volume 3 (Moosighidanane Irani, Jelde 3). Iran Heritage Society (US) / Roshanak Publications, Tehran, 2008, ISBN 964-93867-3-4
- A Century of Cello Music from Persia (ed). Persian Dutch Network, Amsterdam, 2022. (2022)

Film (Documentary)

- Hayedeh: Legendary Persian Diva (2009)
- Taq Kasra: Wonder of Architecture (2017)
- Derbent: What Persia Left Behind (2022).

Music (released pieces)

- Persian piano music: "Fable", based on a piece by Homayoun Khorram; live Performance Amsterdam (iTunes 2009)
