= Jaam-e-Jam (TV channel) =

Jaam-e-Jam (also spelled as Jam-e Jam; Persian: جام جم) was a Persian-language television channel based in Los Angeles featuring content from Iranian immigrants, active from the early 1980s until 2017.

== History ==
Jaam-e Jam was established in the early 1980s by Manuchehr Bibian (also known as Manouchehr Bibiyan). He was a former recording company director from Tehran, who moved to Southern California following the Iranian Revolution in 1979.

The television station was critical of the Islamic government of Iran, and has received a great deal of media attention as a result. In particular, the station has featured sketch comedy that has parodied the leaders of the Iranian government. In addition, the station recorded numerous music videos by Persian classical and pop stars in the 1980s and 1990s e.g. Hayedeh, Moein, Ebi and Sattar. The channel used to be available via cable and later satellite. The station halted its activities in 2017.

== See also ==
- Iranian Americans
- List of Persian-language television channels
