= Sadegh Nojouki =

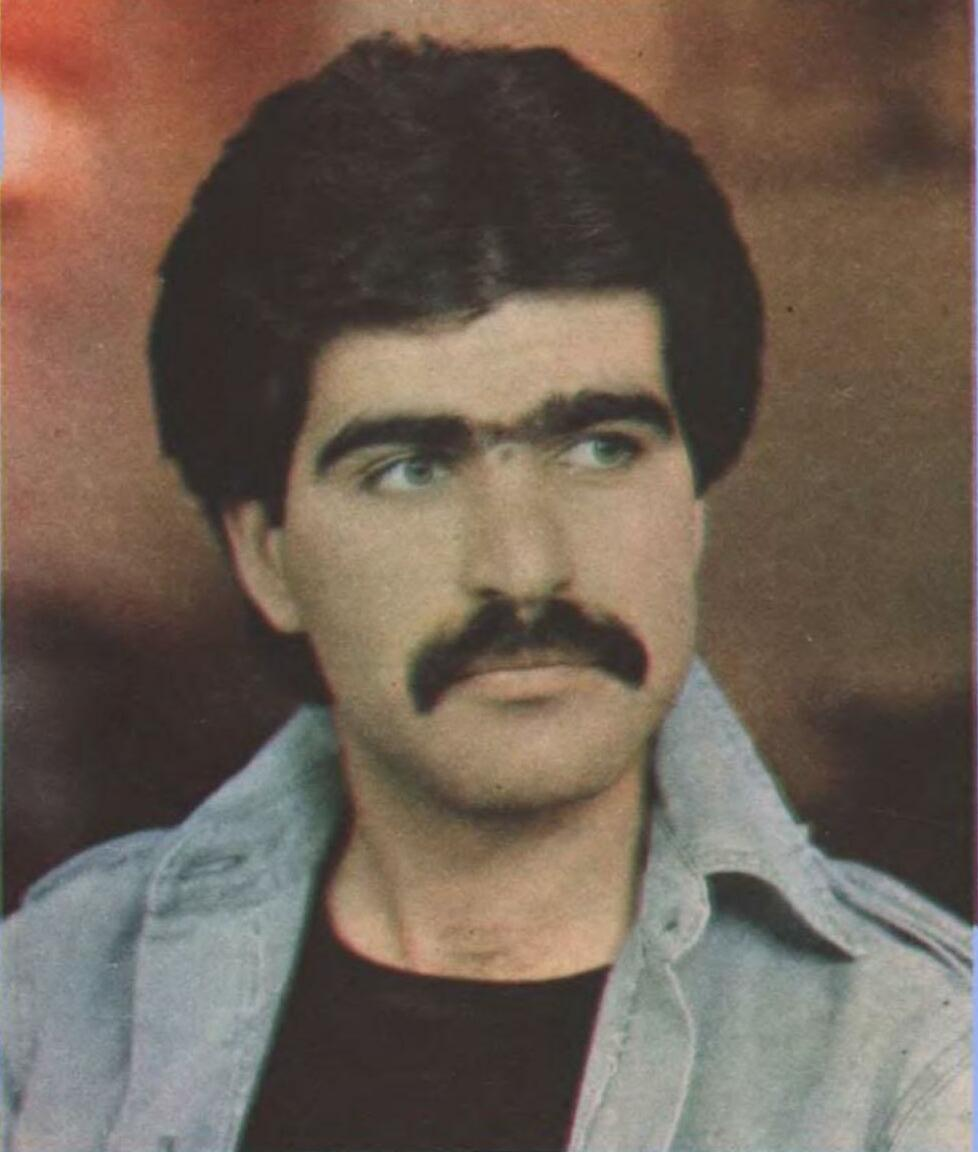

Background information
- Born: Sadegh Nojouki; February 11, 1950 (age 75); Tehran, Iran
- Origin: Tehran, Iran
- Genres: Persian pop music, Persian traditional music, Western Classical music
- Occupations: Musician, composer, songwriter, arranger, music producer, pianist
- Instruments: Piano, synthesizer, accordion
- Years active: 1970–present

Sadegh Nojouki (Persian: صادق نوجوکی; born February 11, 1950, in Tehran) is a famous Iranian musician, composer, arranger, and pianist of Persian classical and pop music. He is credited for the first use of string orchestras and pianos in Iranian pop music. He currently resides in Los Angeles, United States.

He composed and arranged many songs for popular Iranian pop singers including Hayedeh, Sattar, Homeyra, Mahasti, Moein, Dariush, Omid, Martik, Vigen, Ebi, Shohreh, Leyla Forouhar, Googoosh, Morteza, Maziar, etc.
