= Noor-e Omid Choir =

Afghan musical group

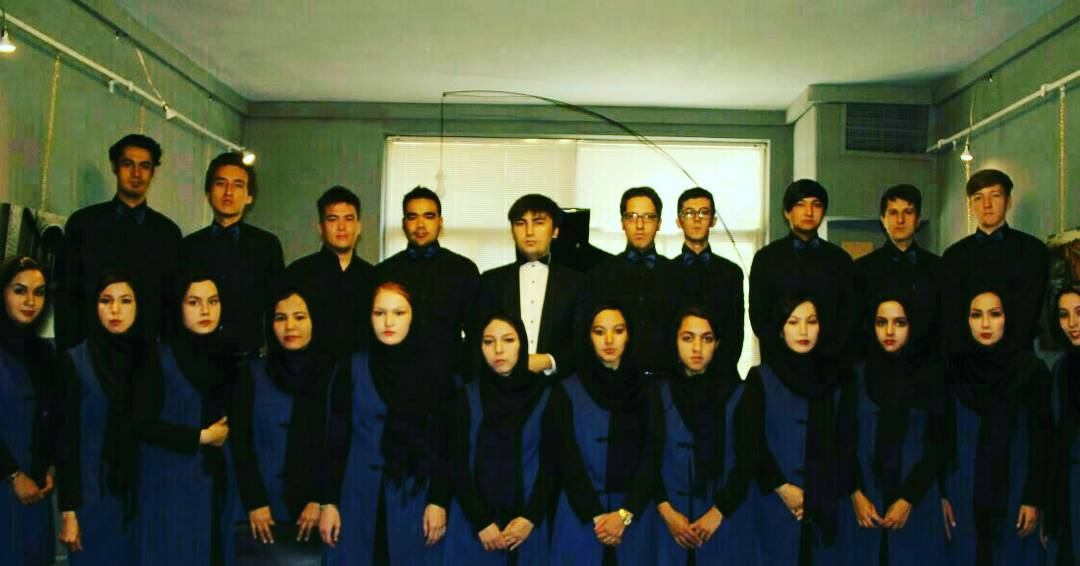
- Noor-e Omid choir's first private performance

Background information
- Origin: Afghanistan
- Genres: Classical
- Years active: 2015–present
- Website: nooreomidco.com

Noor-e Omid Choir is an amateur SATB choir and the first choir of the kind in Afghanistan.

It was founded in 2015 by a 22-year-old Afghan musician, Omid Noori, who has been the conductor of the choir since then. He also happens to be the first operatic singer in Afghanistan.

Noor-e Omid is the first polyphonic choir in the history of Afghanistan music; all the former ensembles were singing in unison known as “chorus”, which indicates the structure of such choirs in native language.

Noor-e Omid participated successfully in 9th World Choir Games, Sochi, Russia, July 2016” as their first participation in an international choral competition. The choir was honored with the title “Miracle of Sochi” by Prof. Dr. Ralf Eisenbeiß, Artistic Director of the World Choir Games 2016.

The choir’s main focus is classical pieces and it currently has 30 members.
