= Mohammad Heydari =

Iranian musician

Mohammad Heydari (Persian: محمد حیدری; December 23, 1937 – August 23, 2016) was a Persian santur player and songwriter.

== Career ==
After the 1979 Iranian Revolution, Mohammad Heydari left the country for Italy and a few years later moved to Los Angeles, where he continued to work as a soloist and songwriter. Some of his nostalgic songs such as "Zahr-e Jodai" and "Bahar Bahar" (both performed by Hayedeh) became popular in the Persian community. Heydari also wrote melodies for other Persian hit songs such as Bia Benevisim and Sobhet Bekheir Azizam.

Mohammad Heydari
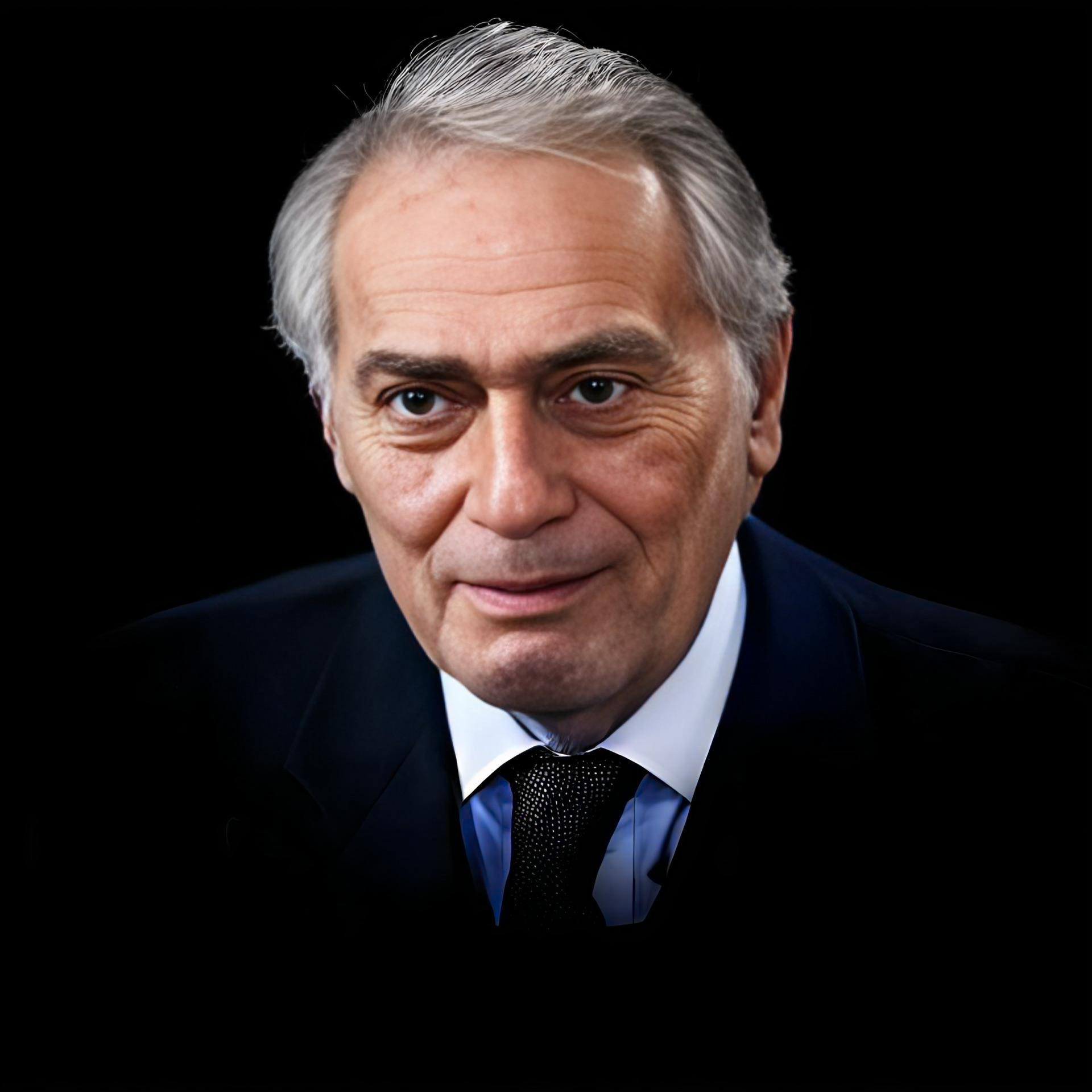

Background information
- Born: 23 December 1937
- Died: 23 August 2016 (aged 78)
- Occupations: Santur player, songwriter
- Instrument: Santur

== Death ==
Mohammad Heydari died of cancer in a hospital in Los Angeles on 23 August 2016, aged 79.
