= Iranian Film Festival =

Annual festival in the Netherlands

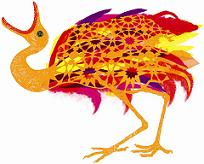
The Iranian Film Festival 2008 logo

The Iranian Film Festival (IFF) was a film festival held annually in the Netherlands. Until now, the festival has taken place in Utrecht (2007), Rotterdam (2008), and in 2009 the festival will take place in filmtheatre De Fabriek in Zaandam.

== Aim of the festival ==
The Iranian Film Festival focuses on the film culture of contemporary Iran. The Iranian Film Festival was set up by an independent organisation, that cooperates with independent filmmakers, distributors and production companies from Iran.
