= Hayedeh =

Iranian singer (1942–1990)

- هایده
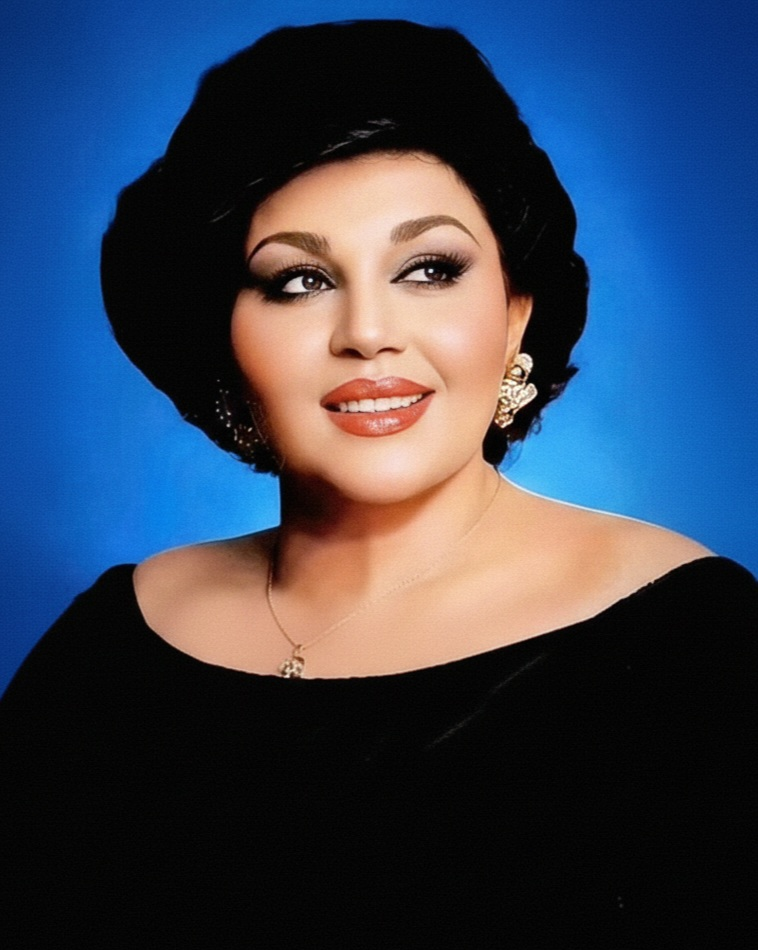
- Hayedeh in 1975
- Born: Masoumeh Dadehbala; April 10, 1942; Tehran, Iran
- Died: January 20, 1990 (aged 47); San Francisco, California, U.S.
- Resting place: Westwood Village Memorial Park Cemetery; 34°03′30″N 118°26′26″W
- Occupations: Singer; media personality
- Years active: 1968–1990
- Children: 3
- Relatives: Mahasti (sister)
- Musical career
- Genres: Persian classical; folk; Persian pop
- Labels: Taraneh; Caltex; Avang; MZM
- Website: hayedehdocumentary.com

Masoumeh Dadehbala (Note: Persian: معصومه دده‌بالا, romanized: Masume Dadebâlâ) (April 10, 1942 – January 20, 1990), known professionally as Hayedeh (Note: Persian: هایده, romanized: Hâyde, IPA: [hɑːˈjedeh]), was an Iranian singer and media personality. She is widely considered an iconic vocalist and one of the most prominent and influential singers in Iran and the Persian world.

Born in Tehran, Hayedeh was the older sister of another prominent singer, Mahasti. Hayedeh began singing by listening to songs on radio and television and was often compared to Delkash, and learned music from several teachers. She began her professional career in 1968 by performing on the radio program Golha. Later, she began collaborating with other musicians and releasing songs such as "Soghati".

In 1978, Hayedeh moved to the United Kingdom amid the Iranian Revolution and called her immigration "a fitna". In 1982, she moved to the United States to continue her musical career. There was where she released the song "Bahar Bahar Az Omadeh Dobareh" with the theme of nostalgia for pre-revolutionary Iran.

In her final years, Hayedeh suffered from mental health problems and she died of a heart attack in 1990 at the age of 47, the day after performing at a concert in San Francisco. In April 2019, the Los Angeles City Council recognized and celebrated Hayedeh, one of the most celebrated singers in Persian culture.

== Early life ==
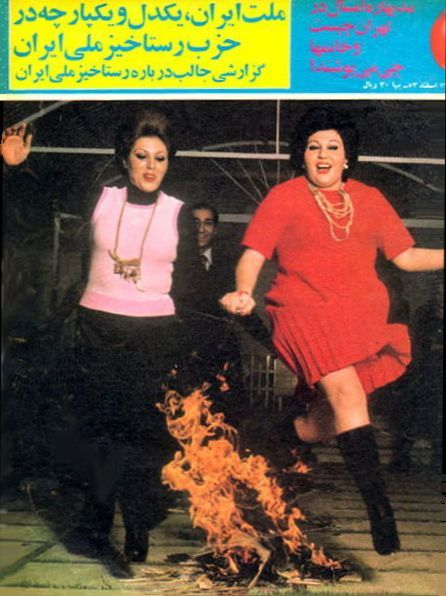
Hayedeh and Mahasti leaping over a fire together during Chaharshanbe Suri, 1975

Masoumeh Dadehbala was born on April 10, 1942 in Tehran. She was the elder sister of another popular singer Mahasti. Her father, Mohammad Dedeh Bala, was born in the village of Dedeh Bala, a suburb of Tabriz, and her mother, Zeinab Bulgari, was a Mawloodi singer of religious tables and ceremonies, and Hayedeh and her sister Mahasti often participated in these Mawloodi ceremonies with her mother as a child.

Hayedeh stood out first for her powerful, operatic and alto voice, and then for refining her voice with greater precision, lyricism, and variety. Hayedeh's voice was aesthetically compared to the voice of another Iranian singer, Delkash, who was older than her. In addition to her remarkable vocal ability, Hayedeh's popularity among Iranian listeners was primarily due to her mastery of the principles of the Music Foundation, Zaya's voice, a collection of Persian songs, and the performance of singing lines.

== Music career ==
=== Pahlavi era (1968–1978) ===
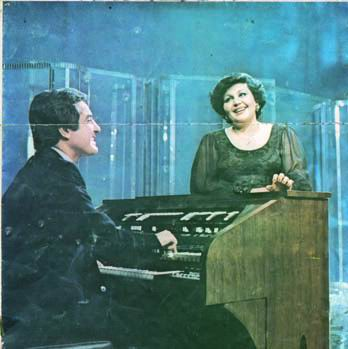
Hayedeh and Anoushiravan Rohani on National Iranian Radio and Television, 1975

Her professional career began in 1968 as a singer on a Persian traditional music program in Radio Tehran called "Golhâye Rangârang" (Persian: گلهای رنگارنگ "Colorful Flowers") directed by Davoud Pirnia. Hayedeh studied Avaz (Persian vocal music) with the Persian violinist and composer Ali Tajvidi.

"Azadeh" (1968), which was composed by Ali Tajvidi, with lyrics by Rahi Moayeri, was Hayedeh's first official hit and debut also. It was first performed in 1968 on Radio Tehran with the Gol-ha Orchestra. In this year she released another titled Raftam (1968).

In the 1970s, Hayedeh added Persian pop music to her classical Persian repertoire. In this period Hayedeh worked with several songwriters, such as Fereydoun Khoshnoud, Jahanbakhsh Pazouki, Anoushiravan Rohani and Mohammad Heydari. "Bezan Tar", "Gol-e Sang", "Nowrouz Aamad", and "Soghati" were among her works during this period.

Composer Mohammad Heydari, who composed many of Hayedeh's songs, says of the first days he met Hayedeh: "I first saw Hayedeh at Mahasti's house, and the first song I composed for her was called "Haif." Before me, Hayedeh worked with Ali Tajweedi and Homayoun Khorram. These two sisters were very good at singing. When I composed a melody and gave it to them, they would add things like writing to it. Sometimes I was satisfied, Hayedeh would say: "No, I have to sing this one more time." Hayedeh knew the instruments well, and when she sang, she didn't wander from one corner to another. Tajweedi had taught her. We didn't tell her how to sing. Mahasti had a softer voice than Hayedeh, but Hayedeh had more power, but in Hayedeh's house she had more influence and command of words.

In March 1975, around the time the Algiers Agreement was signed, Saddam Hussein had traveled to Iran. One night, while he was in Tehran, a program was held in the Shah's palace where Hayedeh and Mahasti sang for Saddam. After Saddam returned to Iraq, he invited the two singers and Shahram Mirian, a close family friend of Hayedeh and the head of the news team from the National Iranian Radio and Television group, at the time to Baghdad alongside forty dancers from the Ministry of Culture and Arts. Mirian had stated "Every night when Hayedeh and Mahasti performed there, the audience would say, "Dashti, Dashti." I asked: "Do you mean the theme of our music?" I then understood that Dashti meant Hayedeh singing. Mirian went on to make a '2.5-hour' TV show, possibly Jam-e-Jaam as a returnee from Iraq, which received a lot of attention.

=== Post-revolutionary career (1978–1990) ===
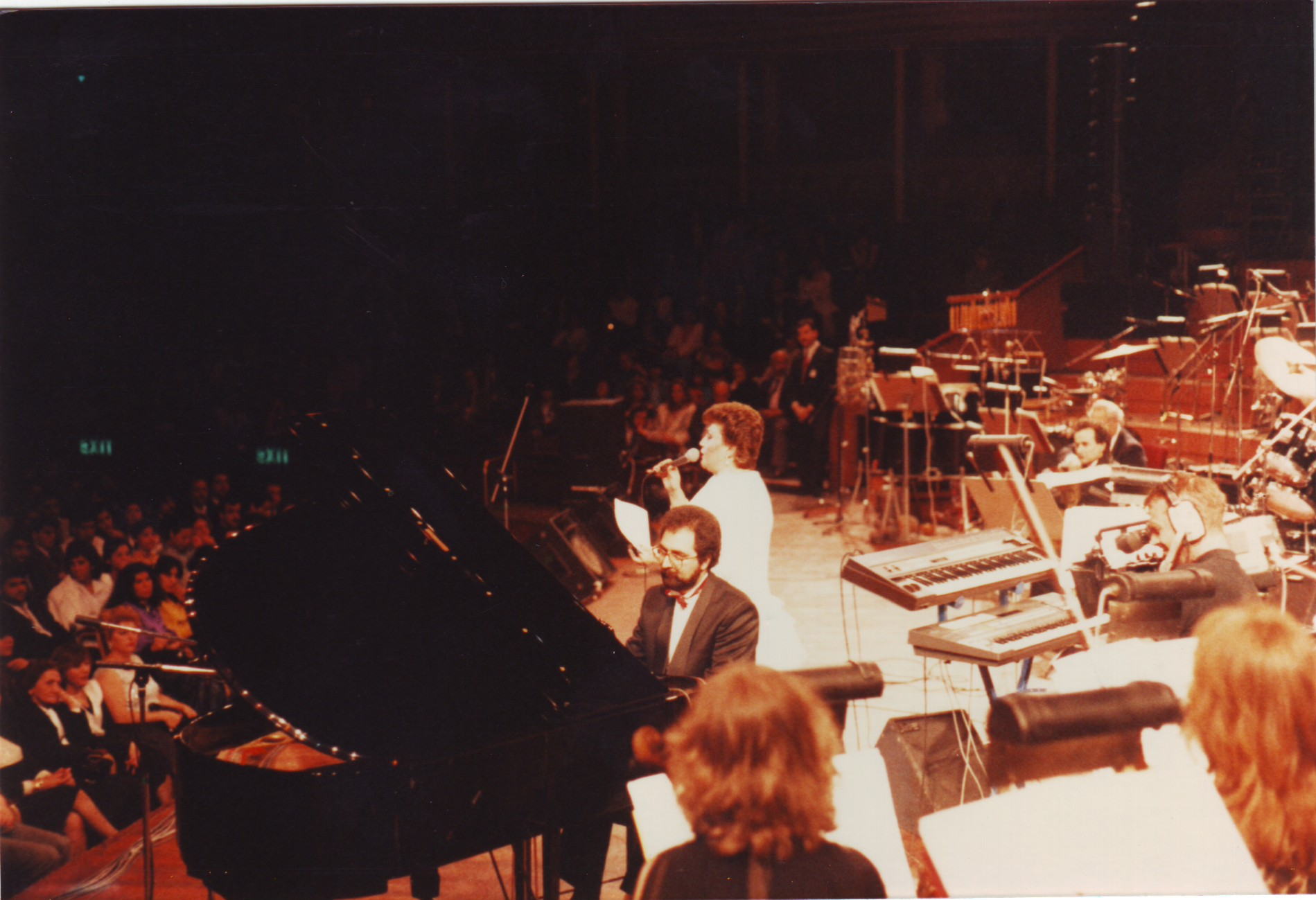
Hayedeh performing a concert at the Royal Albert Hall in London, 1987

On August 29, 1978, Hayedeh immigrated to the United Kingdom. She had left Iran before the revolution because she was nervous. She stated: Iran has usurped and occupied us. Sources indicate the luxurious house she had on 'Jordan Street' had been confiscated by the rebels and had bought a small apartment in the U.S. (?) for her daughter. She was very upset about the matter in a correspondence from Radio Farda. The next year, Iran underwent the 1979 Islamic Revolution. She stayed there for three years and moved to the United States in 1982 to continue her singing career.

When Hayedeh left the country, her morale had declined, but her activity had increased. She had been invited to perform in Germany, and when her team went, they saw that it was a small dining hall, and they advised her not to do it and not to damage her prestige, emphasizing Hayedeh's status and class. But, later big programs started, and she came and was received with great enthusiasm.

Caltex Records, an Iranian recording label, supported Hayedeh in her career, under the patronage of renowned impresario "Saam."

Hayedeh lived in Los Angeles from 1982 until the end of her life. The area became a hub for the Persian (Iranian) community in Southern California since the 1980s.

Hayedeh released many successful albums during this time, and all her songs were bootlegged in Iran. Hayedeh's political and nostalgic songs such as "Rouzaye Roshan", "Ghesseyeh Man" and "Zendegi" became very popular with the Iranian exile community.

Her songwriters and producers in the United States were mostly Sadegh Nojouki and Mohammad Heydari. Songwriters she worked with were Ardalan Sarfaraz, Homa Mir-Afshar and Bijan Samandar. Songwriter who wrote more than 30 of Hayedeh's songs and hits was her best friend Leila Kasra (a.k.a. Hedieh), who was featured in many of her albums reciting her poems. During her exile, Hayedeh regularly appeared on the Los Angeles-based Persian-language TV channels IRTV, Jaam-E-Jam and Jonbesh TV.

== Death and funeral ==
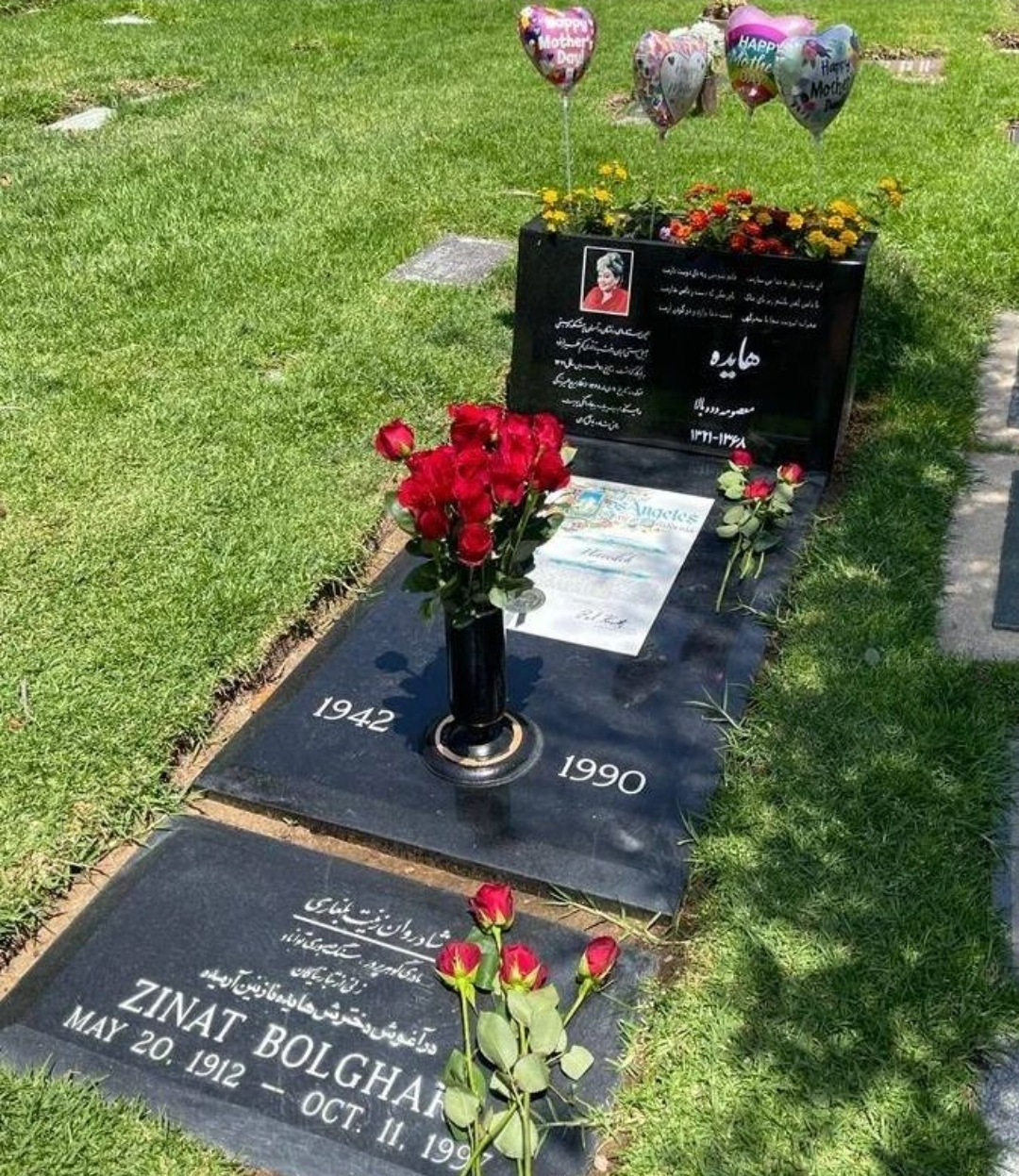
Hayedeh's grave at Westwood Village Memorial Park Cemetery in the Westwood area of Los Angeles

On January 20, 1990, during a midnight performance at the Casablanca Club, near San Francisco, California, Hayedeh died from a heart attack onstage. She was rushed to a hospital. She was 47 years old. She had a history of diabetes and hypertension. Before her death, Hayedeh had suffered a stroke, and was given medical advice to not take long flights.

Thousands of fans attended Hayedeh's funeral in Los Angeles. On January 24, 1990, she was buried at the Westwood Village Memorial Park Cemetery in Los Angeles, California. She had been recording an album shortly before her death and was due to finish recording it after she returned from her concert in San Francisco.

The day Hayedeh collapsed on stage and died in the hospital, composer Mohammad Heydari had gone to talk to Mahasti. Usually, the two sisters had some competition, and Mahasti insisted that her photo be on the cover after Hayedeh's. That day, they called from California and told Mahasti that Hayedeh had died in the hospital. Mahasti was very upset about why she had such a rivalry with her sister in life.

Mehdi Zakai, the editor of the Los Angeles-based youth magazine, who conducted one of the last interviews with Hayedeh before her death, stated: "We put her on the cover and Hossam Abrishami designed the cover design. Hayedeh's face was very sad and she was looking somewhere in the distance, and Abrishami drew a doll in front of her face that was dancing. The week after the magazine was published, Hayedeh passed away. We had several letters from people familiar with Native American issues who said: "In Native American areas and southern Mexico, this doll is a sign of death that was drawn in front of Hayedeh's face", while neither Hossam Abrishami nor I knew anything."

On April 10, 2022, at the same time as Hayedeh's 80th birthday, her tombstone was changed in the presence of her family and fans.

== Legacy ==
Hayedeh's albums are still best sellers and her songs are played on Persian TV and radio channels outside Iran. Many of her songs are sung by Iranian pop singers. Houshmand Aghili performed Hayedeh's "Sarab", Parviz Rahman Panah remixed her "Saal", Shahla Sarshar performed a tragic song called "In Memory of Hayedeh", singer Amir did a cover of Hayedeh's song "Soghati" in 2008 and Mahasti performed three songs in memory of her late sister.

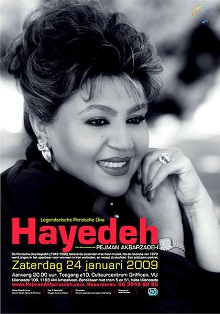
Premiere Poster of the documentary Hayedeh: Legendary Persian Diva, by Pejman Akbarzadeh, Amsterdam, January 2009

According to Prof. Erik Nakhjavani in Encyclopædia Iranica:

"Analogous to Delkash, before her, Hayedeh sang with technical authority and passionate energy. Her laryngeal control made it possible for her to produce a series of graceful vibrato and glissando vocalizations required by the Avaz Persian vocal music. She could smoothly pass from the upper reaches of her alto voice to the lower, fuller, and darker range of the contralto. This mixture of strong laryngeal strength and learned vocal technique gave her alto-contralto voice a rare, powerful resonance and texture in the performance of the Avaz. Furthermore an acute sense for musical timing, the rhythmic flow of vocal music, affective musical phrasing, and poetic delivery enabled her to express and interpret effectively any songs she sang."

Iranian pianist and journalist Pejman Akbarzadeh made a documentary Hayedeh: Legendary Persian Diva about Hayedeh which was screened in Amsterdam in January 2009 for the first time. The documentary had its US premiere in May 2009 at the Noor Iranian Film Festival in Los Angeles and was nominated for Best Documentary at the festival. The film was also screened at 9th International Exile Film Festival (Sweden) and the 4th Iranian Film Festival in the Netherlands. Tehran-based FARS News Agency (close to the Islamic Revolutionary Guard) cited the documentary as a film on the "Corrupt monarchist singer Hayedeh". The documentary was released on DVD on 20 January 2010, the 20th anniversary of Hayedeh's death, by "Persian Dutch Network" in Amsterdam. Various American universities have streamed the documentary on their server for educational purposes as well.

In April 2019, the Los Angeles City Council recognized and celebrated Hayedeh, one of the most celebrated singers in Persian culture.

== Partial discography ==
=== Studio albums ===
- Azadeh (1968)
- Raftam (1968)
- Nasepasi (1969)
- Afsaneh Shirin (1970) – with Shajarian
- Yaarab (1986)
- Hamkhooneh (1984) – with Viguen
- Shabeh Eshgh (1985)
- Shanehayat (1986)
- Sogand (1988)
- Safar (1988) – with Moein
- Ey Zendegi Salaam (1989)
- Golhayeh Ghorbat (1990) – with Moein
- Bezan Taar (1991)
- Kharabati (1991)
- Golvaazheh (1991)
- Khoda Hafez (1991)
- Paadeshahe Khoobaan (1992)
- Roozaayeh Roshan (1992)
- Shabeh Asheghan – with Sattar
- Naa Shanidehaa
- Faryad
- Bolboli Ke Khaamosh Shod
- Aamadanet Mahaaleh
- Owje Sedaa
- Mehmaan
- Hayf
- Taranehyeh Saal

=== Compilation ===
- Best of Hayedeh
- 40 Golden Hits of Hayedeh
- 40 Hayedeh Golden Songs, Vol I
- Hayedeh Golden Songs, Vol II
- Shirin Jaan, Hayedeh 4
- Dashtestani, Hayedeh 5
- Afsaneh Shirin, Hayedeh 8

== See also ==
- Persian classical music
- Music of Iran
- Persian women musicians
- Persian pop music
