= Iranian pop music =

Music genre

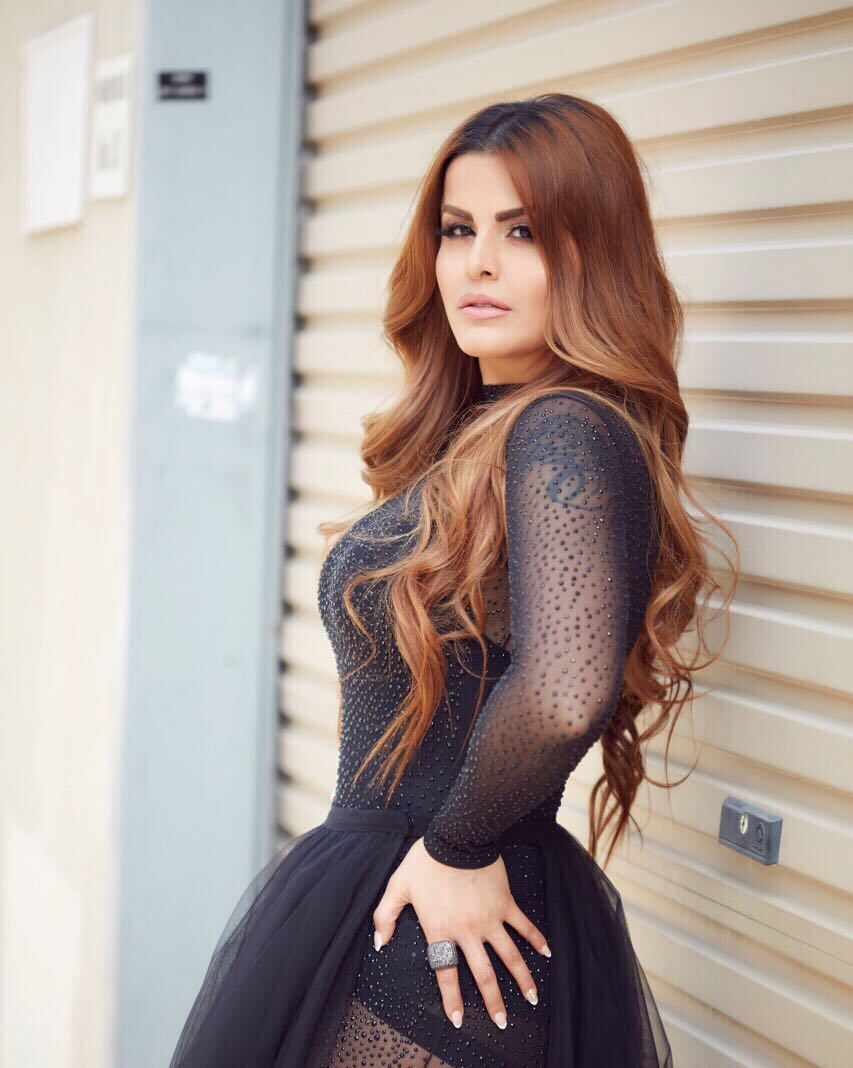
Sahar, known for her contributions to Persian pop music

Iranian pop music or Persian pop music (Persian: موسیقی پاپ ایرانی) refers to pop music originated in Iran, with songs mainly in Persian and other regional Persian dialects of the country and region.

== History ==
=== Early Iranian popular music ===
Following the invention of radio in 1930, and after World War II, a form of popular music emerged and began to develop in Iran.

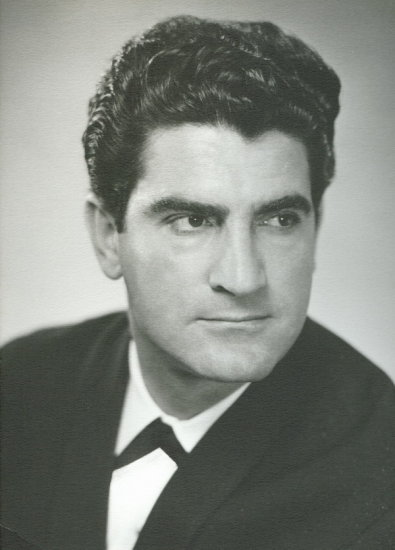
Viguen, Iran's "Sultan" of pop and jazz music.

=== 1950s–70s ===
Prior to the 1950s, Iran's music industry was dominated by traditional singers.Iran's Western-influenced pop music emerged by the 1950s. Viguen, known as the "Sultan" of Iranian pop and jazz music, was a pioneer of this change. He was one of Iran's first musicians to perform with a guitar.

Some of Iran's classical pop artists include Hayedeh, Mahasti, Andy, Aref, Dariush, Ebi, Faramarz Aslani, Farhad, Fereydun Farrokhzad, Giti Pashaei, Googoosh, Hassan Shamaizadeh, Homeyra, Leila Forouhar, Nooshafarin, Shahram Shabpareh, Varoujan, shohreh solati, and Bijan Mortazavi.

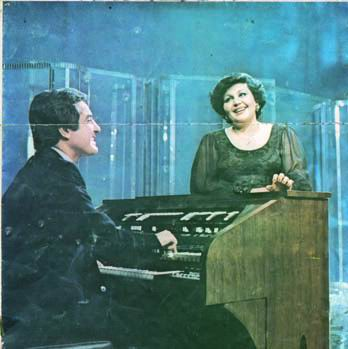
Hayedeh and Anoushirvan rohani on the Iranian National Television, in 1975.

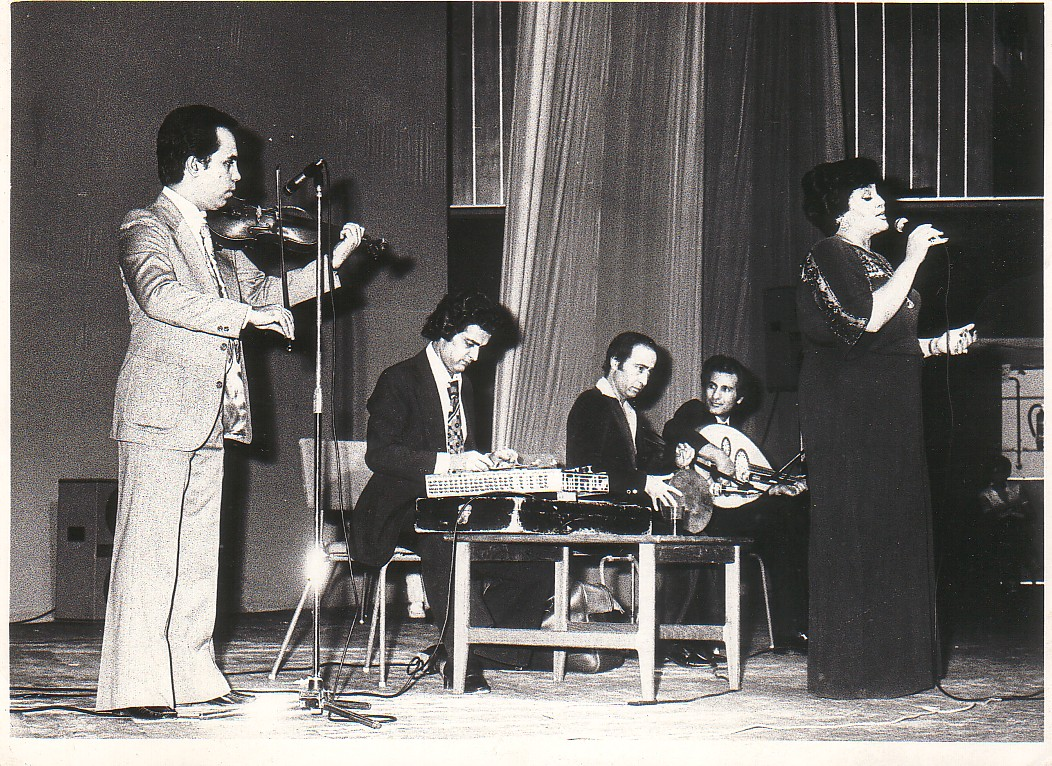
Hayedeh, Loghman Adhami, and other musicians at a concert, in the 1970s

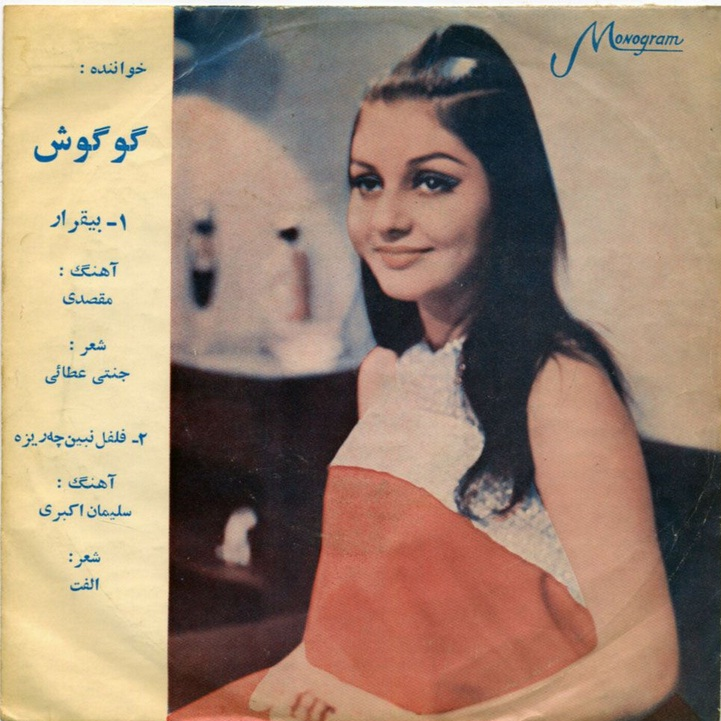
Googoosh on an old music cover.

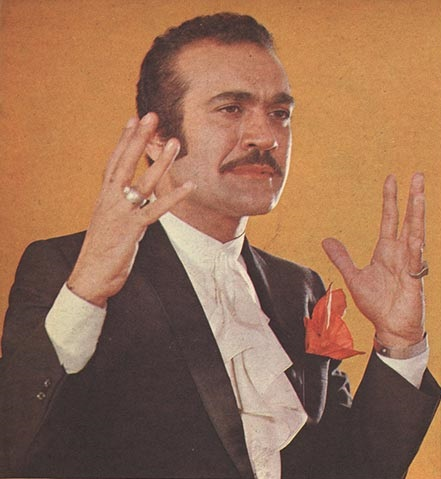
Fereydun Farrokhzad on an old magazine.

=== After the 1979 Islamic Revolution ===
After the 1979 Islamic Revolution, pop music was banned and completely disappeared from the scene in Iran. Many Iranians emigrated to foreign countries, especially to Los Angeles in the United States, and many continued to sing in exile. Such singers have included Leila Forouhar and Hayedeh in the United States, and Rita in Israel. Since then, several popular Iranian TV channels and radio stations have operated outside the country, aired through various satellites. These broadcast companies play an important role in promoting and connecting Iranian pop artists to Iranians living all over the world.

In the 1990s, officials of the new government decided to produce and promote "decent" pop music, in order to compete with the abroad and unofficial sources of Iranian music. Ali Moallem (poet) and Fereydoun Shahbazian (musician) headed a council at the IRIB that supervised the revival of domestic pop music.

Shadmehr Aghili was one of the first post-revolutionary Iranian singers who received significant support, including promotion on national television, to produce new Persian pop songs inside Iran. He was skilled at playing violin and guitar, and was a talented singer. He became a successful musician and singer in Iran, but eventually immigrated to Canada and then moved to Los Angeles, continuing his career outside Iran.

Under the presidency of Khatami, as a result of easing cultural restrictions within Iran, a number of new pop singers emerged from within the country. After the new administration took office, the Ministry of Culture and Islamic Guidance adopted a different policy, mainly to make it easier to monitor the industry. The newly adopted policy included loosening restrictions for a small number of artists, while tightening restrictions for the rest. However, the number of album releases increased.

Arian, the first officially sanctioned pop music band with female singers in post-revolutionary Iran, started a new chapter of Iranian pop music. They collaborated with the British-Irish singer Chris de Burgh in their fourth album Bi to, Ba to, and were the first Iranian band to be featured in the English biographical dictionary and directory of International Who's Who in Music.

In 2001 some younger artists created a movement called Iranian hip hop. Their music was inspired by American hip hop artists like Eminem and Tupac. The government originally banned this genre of music. However, artists like Zedbazi, Hichkas, and others emerged despite this.

In late 2009, Sirvan Khosravi became the first domestic Iranian artist to achieve high-rotation airplay on a regular European radio station. He made his debut with the song Saat-e 9 ("9 O'Clock"), which also made headlines in Iranian online media. In August 2010, Farzad Farzin Amin Rostami made his debut European chart with the song Chike Chike ("Trickle Trickle") from his third legal album Shans ("Chance"). Sahar, who emigrated to the UAE, was one of the other influential singers of Iranian pop music after the 1979 revolution.

== Awards ==
=== Notable International Awards ===
| Year | Recipient | Award / Achievement | Details |
|---|---|---|---|
| 1971 | Googoosh | First prize and golden record at the MIDEM in Cannes | For her 7th record (as Gougoush) featuring two songs in French: "Retour de la Ville" (A-side) and "J'entends Crier Je T'aime" (B-side) |
| 1972 | Googoosh | First prize at the Carthage Music Festival | |
| 1972 | Googoosh | First medal of arts of Tunisia | |
| 1973 | Googoosh | Participation at the Sanremo Music Festival | |
| 2002 | Deep Dish | Grammy Award winner for Best Remixed Recording | For Dido's "Thank You" |
| 2006 | Andy Madadian | Best Middle Eastern Song & Best Middle Eastern Album at the JPF Awards | |
| 2010 | Andy Madadian | Recipient of star on Hollywood Walk of Fame | |
| 2013 | Farzad Farzin | Best Song and Performance at the Art-football Festival | |

== See also ==
- Music of Iran
- List of Iranian musicians
