= Mahasti =

Iranian singer (1946–2007)

- مهستی
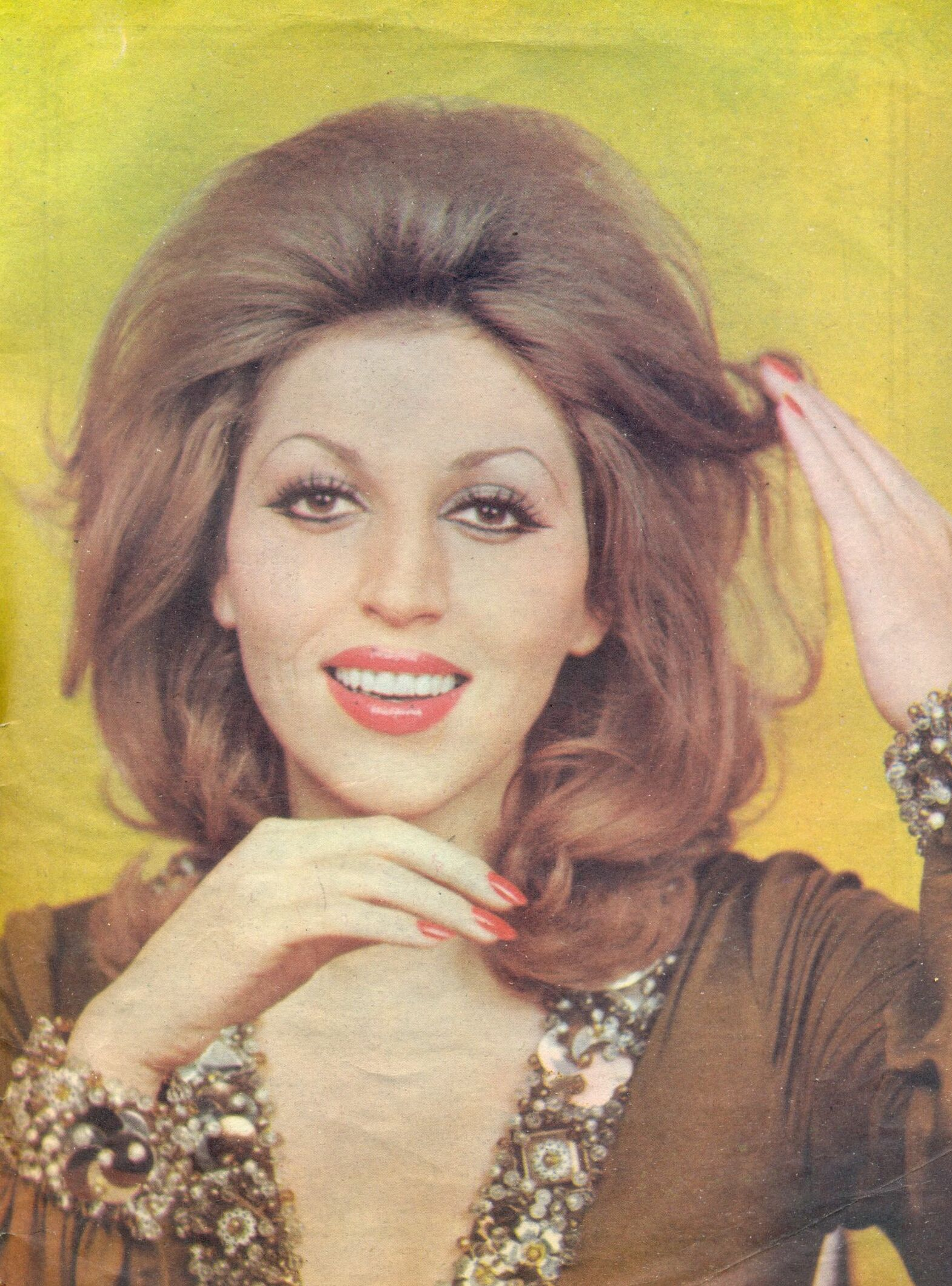
- Mahasti in the 1970s
- Born: Eftekhar Dadehbala (Note: Sources differ with regards to what her actual first name was, with some giving Khadijeh (Persian: خدیجه), and others Eftekhar (افتخار).); November 16, 1946; Tehran, Iran
- Died: June 25, 2007 (aged 60); Santa Rosa, California, U.S.
- Resting place: Westwood Village Memorial Park Cemetery
- Occupation: Singer
- Years active: 1965–2007
- Children: 1
- Relatives: Hayedeh (sister)
- Musical career
- Genres: Persian classical; folk; Persian pop; Jazz

Eftekhar Dadehbala (Note: Persian: افتخار دده‌بالا) (November 16, 1946 – June 25, 2007), known by her stage name Mahasti (Note: Persian: مهستی), was an Iranian singer of Persian classical, folk, and pop music with a mezzo-soprano vocal range. She was active for more than four decades. She was the younger sister of prominent singer Hayedeh.

== Early life and career ==
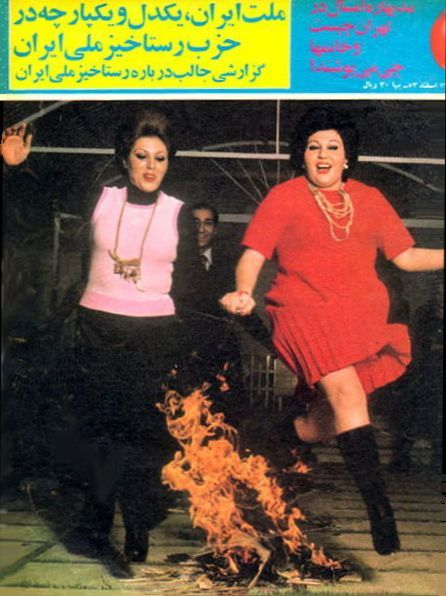
Mahasti (left) and Hayedeh, leaping over a fire at Chaharshanbe Suri in 1975.

Khadijeh (or Eftekhar) Dadehbala was born on November 16, 1946, in Tehran, Iran. She was the younger sister of Iranian singer Hayedeh. Mahasti started her career on the Persian traditional music radio program "Gol hâ ye Rangârang" (Persian: گلهای رنگارنگ "Colorful Flowers") in 1963, with the song "Ân ke Delam Râ Borde Khodâyâ" (Persian: آنكه دلم را برده خدایا) composed and arranged by maestro Parviz Yahaghi with lyrics by Bijan Taraghi.

In the beginning, Mahasti's family was reluctant to allow her to pursue a career in entertainment because it was not an appreciated career for women in Iran at that time. However, Mahasti overcame this stigma providing Iran with a new image for women within the entertainment industry.

Mahasti created an image of a "gentle-woman" singer, a " lady with great manners" . Her success in music paved the way for many other women, including her elder sister, Hayedeh, who started her work 5 years after Mahasti. The two sisters contributed to improving the image of female singers in Iran and the evolution of Iranian popular music.

In 1979, before the Iranian Revolution. she emigrated to the United Kingdom, and then to the United States in 1981, where she lived thereafter.

== Death and burial ==
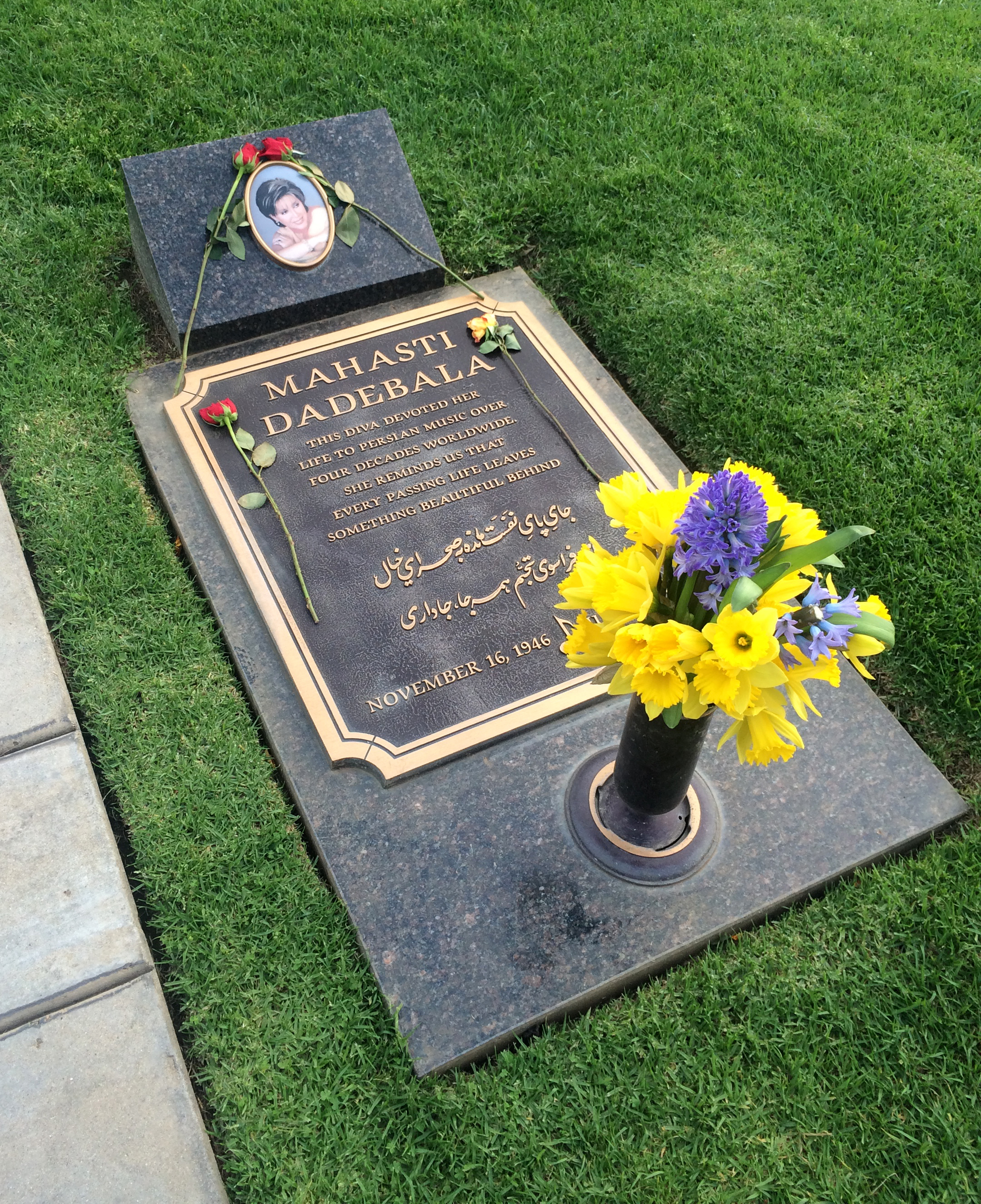
Mahasti's grave at Westwood Village Memorial Park Cemetery in 2016

In March 2007, Mahasti publicly announced that she had had colon cancer for four years. She hoped that her experience would raise awareness within the Iranian community regarding cancer and the importance of regular physical examinations. She was then living in Santa Rosa, California, with her daughter, Sahar, her son-in-law, Naser, and their two children, Natasha and Natalie, her only grandchildren. She died on June 25, 2007, aged 60, in Santa Rosa.

Mahasti was buried at the Westwood Village Memorial Park Cemetery in Westwood, California, on June 29, 2007, the same cemetery where her mother and sister Hayedeh were buried.

Her funeral was broadcast live on Persian Broadcasting Company Tapesh and was attended by many Persian celebrities and stars and other artists including the mayor of Beverly Hills Jimmy Delshad and designer Bijan Pakzad.

== Discography ==
=== Albums ===
- Parandeye Mohajer (1981)
- Eyde Shoma Mobarak (1982) with Sattar & Manoucher Cheshmazar
- Moj (1983)
- Yeki Ra Doost Midaram (1983) with Hayedeh & Houshmand Aghili
- Asheghaneha (1983) with Hayedeh
- Zendegi (1985) with Hayedeh
- Tou Bezan ta Man Beraghsam (1985)
- Gol-haye Ranga-Rang (1988)
- Sepideh Dam (1990)
- Masti (1990)
- Asir (1990)
- Ziyafat (1991)
- Mosafer (1991)
- Ghasam (1993)
- Gole Omid (1993)
- Nameh (1994)
- Ashofteh (1994)
- Beganneh (1994)
- Havay Yaar (1994)
- Parandeha (1995, with Leila Forouhar, Shahram Solati)
- Hagheghat (1995)
- Bazm Mahasty & Sattar (1996)
- Saraabe Eshgh (1996)
- Labkhand (1996) with Shahram Solati
- Havaye Asheghi (1998)
- Avazak (1999)
- Hamishe Ashegh (1999)
- Gole Gandom (2000, with Sattar)
- Deldadeh (2001)
- Hamisheh Sabz (2003)
- Az Khoda Khasteh (2004)

Also appeared on:

- Khatereh 2 (1983) with Hayedeh & Homeyra
- Nargez Shiraz(1984) with Sattar, Hayedeh
- Entekhabi 2 (Sarbaz Kocholoo) (1984)
- Entekhabi 3 (Ghanari) (1985)
- Khatereh 4 (1985) with Ebi, Sattar, Hayedeh
- Khatereh 5 (1986) with Hayedeh, Sadegh Nojouki, Hooshmand Aghili
- Entekhabi 7 (Gozashtehaye Shirin) (1986)
- Entekhabi 8 (Kieh Kieh) (1986)
- Entekhabi 9 (Ya Mowla) (1987)
- Tanine Solh (1987)
- Saghare Hasti (1987) with Moein, Hayedeh, Bahram Forouhar
- Ganjineh 1 (1987) with Moein, Sattar, Hayedeh
- Parastooha (1988) with Sattar, Hayedeh
- Entekhabi 11 (Bi Nazir) (1991)
- Hamsafare Eshgh (1993) with Sattar, Delaram, Fataneh, Ahmad Azad
- Khaneh Ashgegh Koojast (1993) with Homeyra, Sattar, Shohreh, Martik, Emad Ram

=== Singles ===
- 2007: Music (with Leila Forouhar, Andy, Aref)
- In May 2023, 16 years after she died, her voice was used by artificial intelligence and placed on Shadmehr Aghili's song Tamasha, sparking quite a bit of interest from music fans because of the sense of nostalgia and futurism the song provides at the same time. Soon many more pothumous songs were released that featured her and her iconic voice.

== See also ==
- Persian pop music
- Music of Iran
- Persian women musicians
- Hayedeh
