= Babol =

City in Mazandaran province, Iran

Babol Persian: بابل
- City
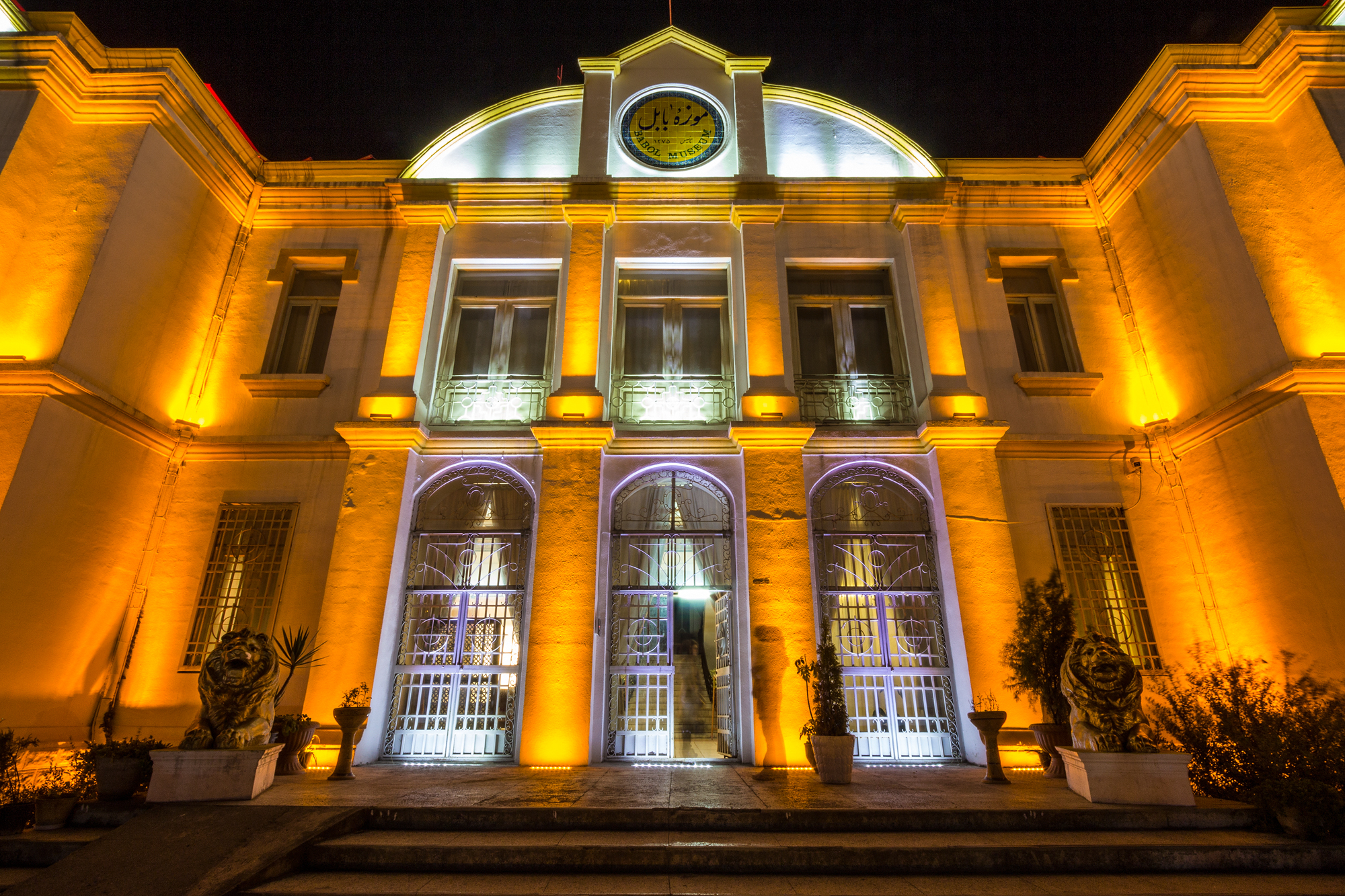
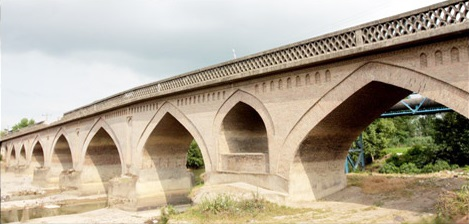
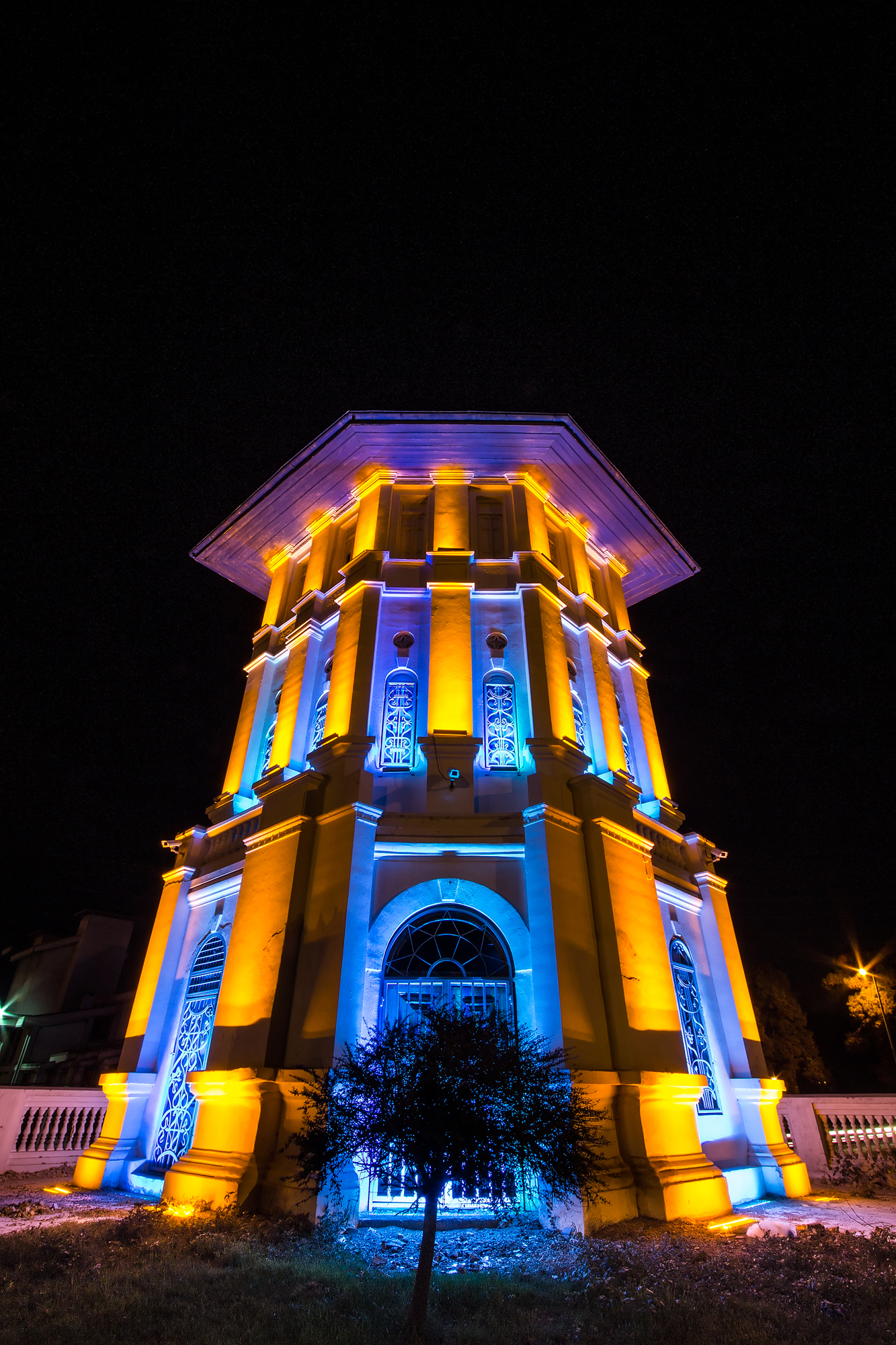
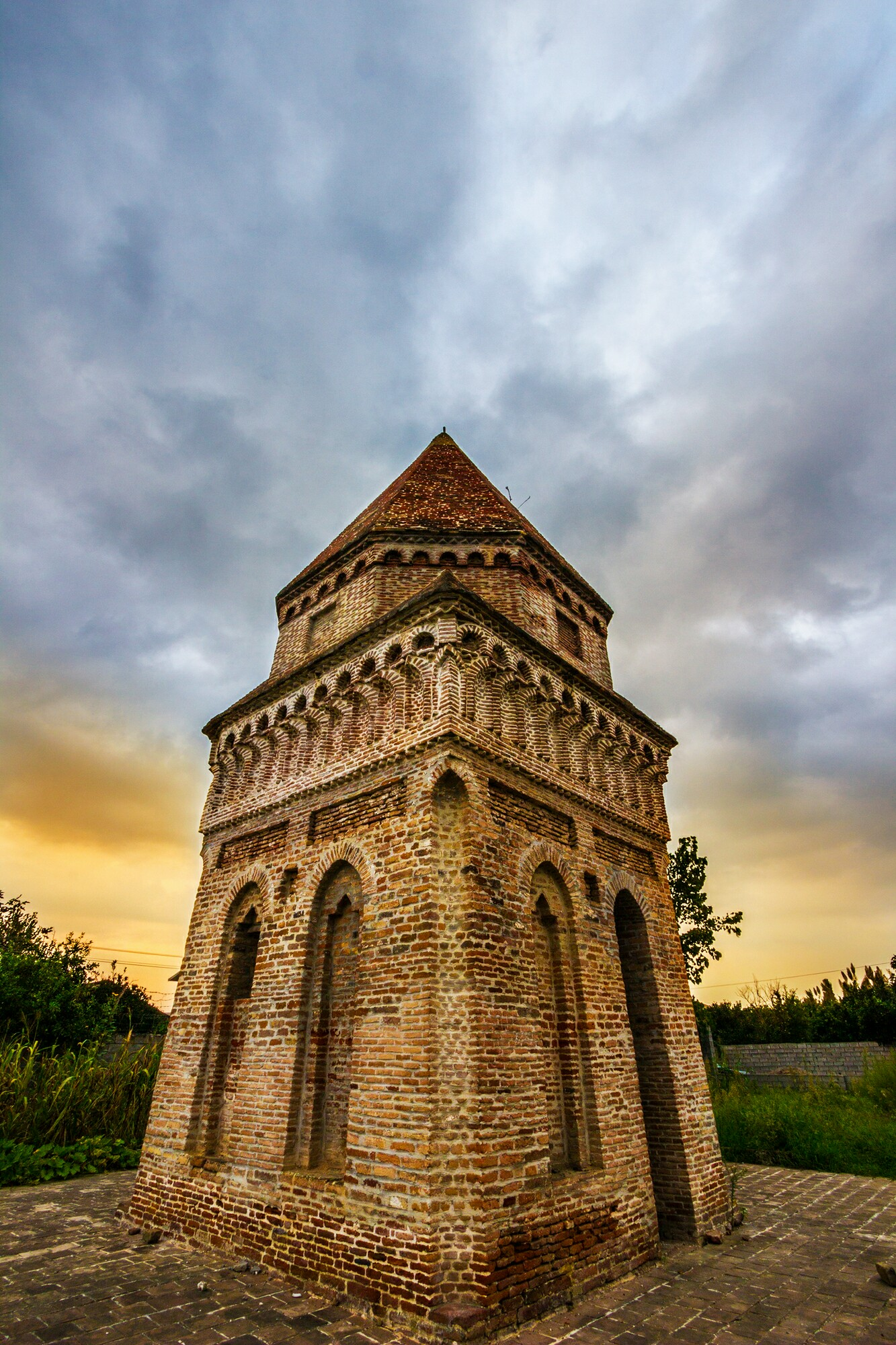
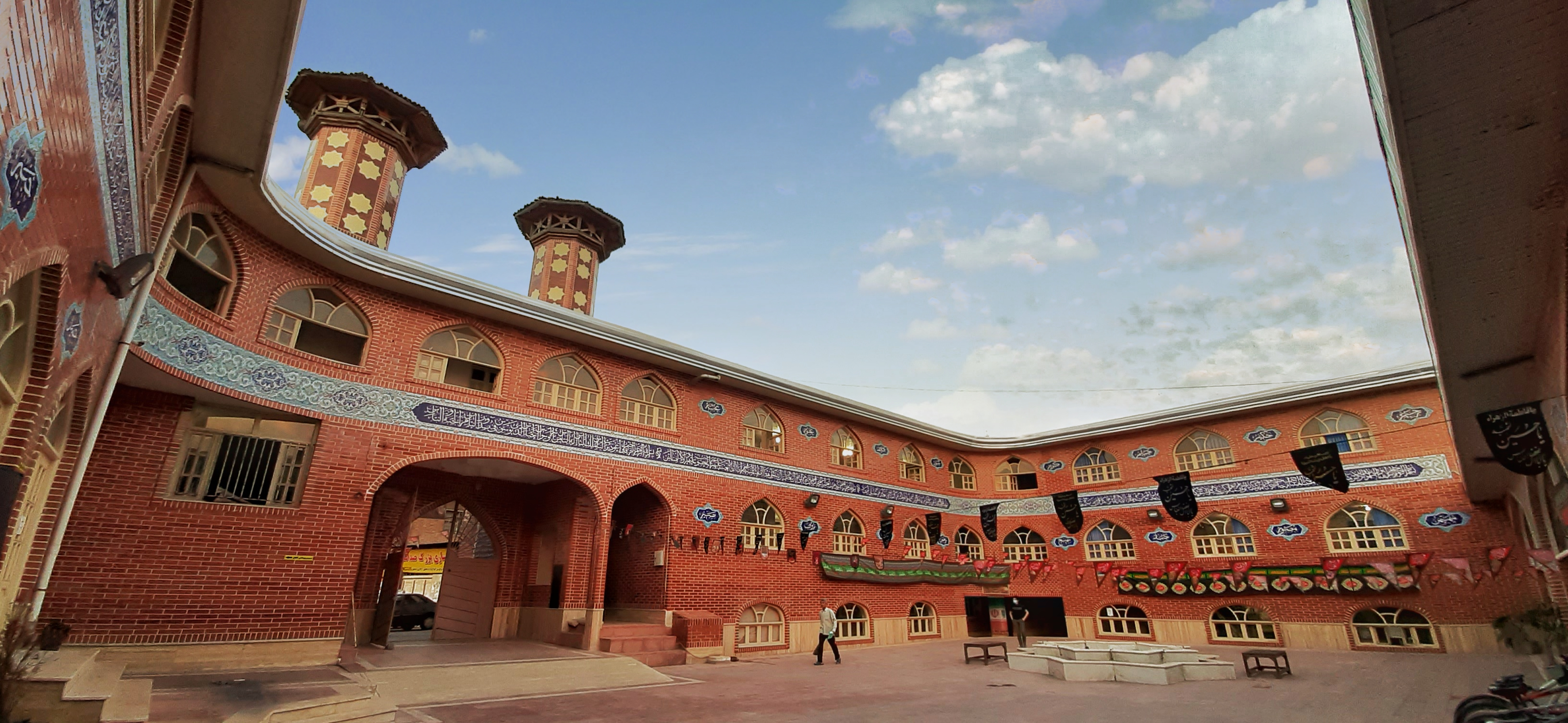
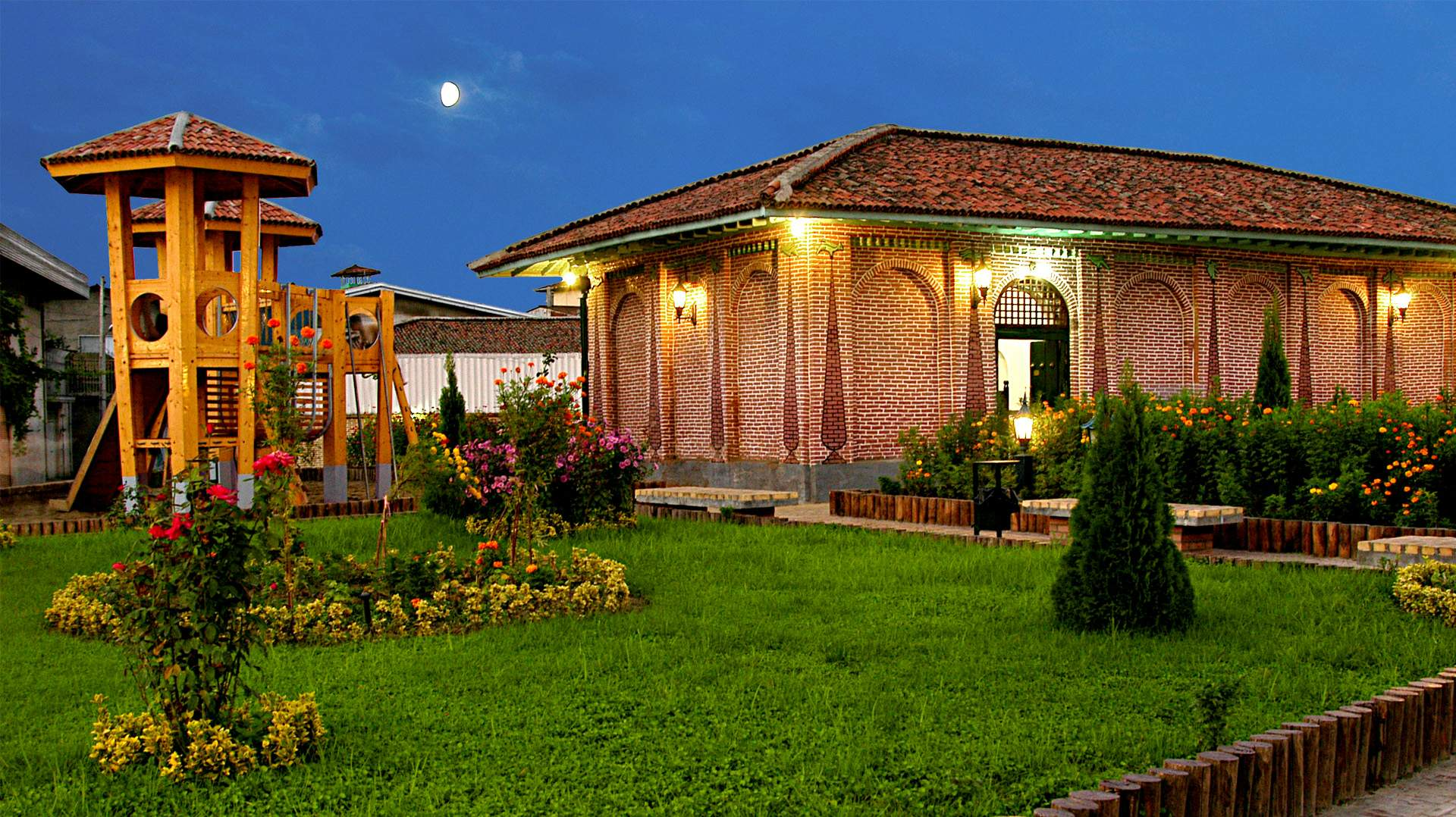

- Location within Iran
- Coordinates: 36°32′51″N 52°40′42″E
- Country: Iran
- Province: Mazandaran
- County: Babol
- District: Central

Government
  - Mayor: Marziyeh Alijan-Nejad

Area
  - Total: 45 km^{2} (17 sq mi)
- Elevation: −2–50 m (−6.6–164.0 ft)

Population (2016)
  - Total: 250,217
  - Density: 5,600/km^{2} (14,000/sq mi)
- Time zone: UTC+3:30 (IRST)
- Postal Code: 48xxx-xxxxx
- Area code: 011
- Vehicle Plate: IRAN ج72, ج82, ص82
- Former Names: Barforoush / Mamatir
- Website: babol.ir

Babol (Persian: بابل; also known as "Orange Blossom City") (Note: Also romanized as Bābol; formerly known as Barfrouch; also known as "Orange Blossom City") is a city in the Central District of Babol County, Mazandaran province, Iran, serving as capital of both the county and the district. Babol is divided into two metropolitan areas (under Iranian law).

== History and etymology ==
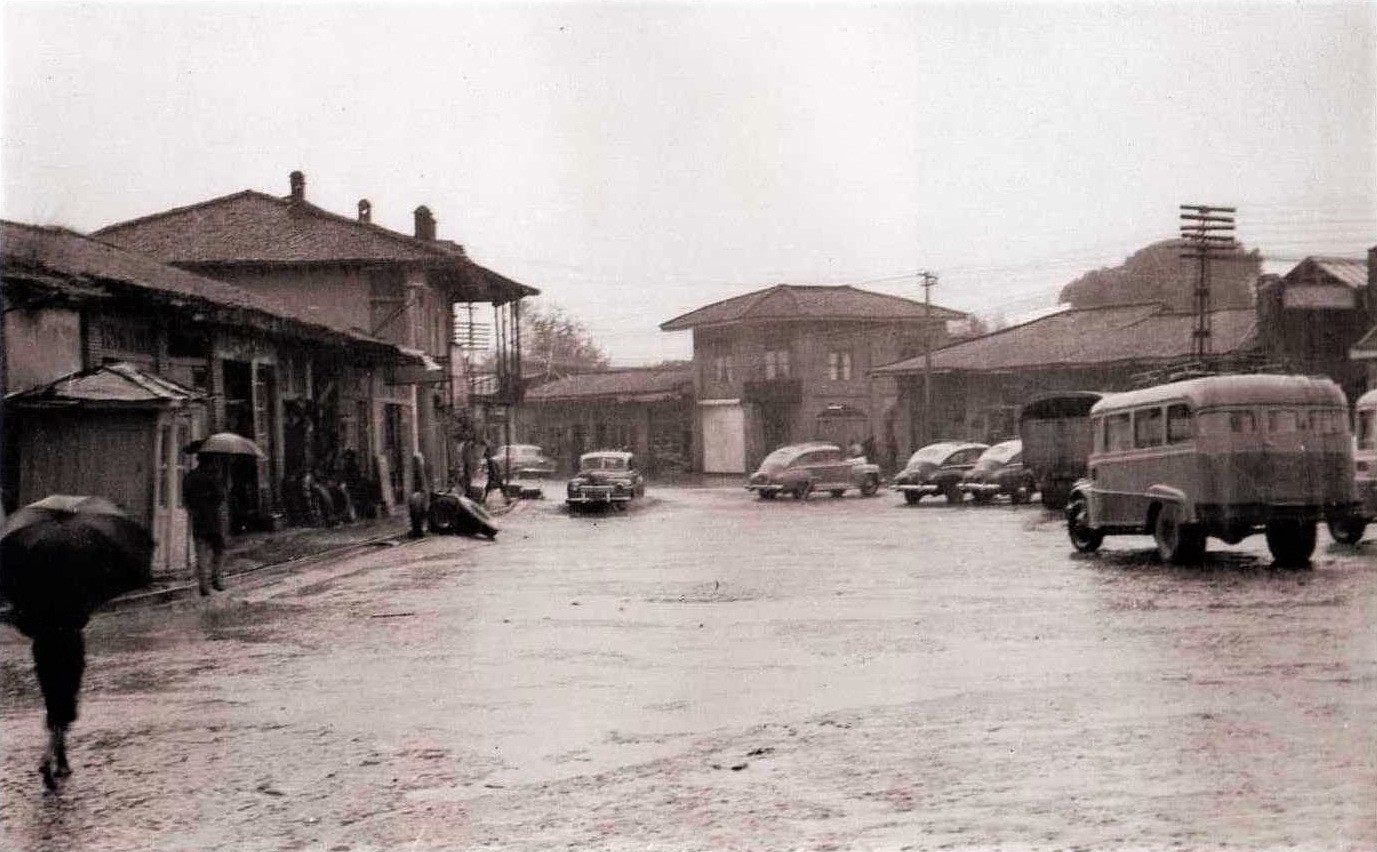
Bahman Square Babol in 1946

Founded by the Safavids in the 16th century, it was built on the site of the ancient city of Mah Mithra (great Mithra). Mithra or 'The Mediator' was believed to be the savior of creation from the threat of darkness and the one who stands between the light of Ahura Mazda and the darkness of Ahriman. Babol was formerly called Barforushdeh (meaning Market Town) and Barforush afterwards. In 1931, the founder of the Pahlavi dynasty Reza Shah (1878-1944) ordered urban planning efforts to commence in the city and changed its name to Babol, which means city with abundant water supply.

== Demographics ==
=== Language and ethnicity ===
Mazandarani people have a background in Tabari ethnicity and speak Mazandarni. Their origin goes back to the Tapuri people, who were forced to migrate to the south coast of the Caspian Sea during the Achaemenid dynasty.

The native people of Sari, Shahi, Babol, Amol, Nowshahr, Chalus, and Tonekabon are Mazandarani people and speak the Mazandarani language.

=== Population ===
Population history
| Year | Pop. | ±% |
|---|---|---|
| 1956 | 36,194 | — |
| 1966 | 49,973 | +38.1% |
| 1976 | 68,059 | +36.2% |
| 1986 | 115,320 | +69.4% |
| 1991 | 137,348 | +19.1% |
| 1996 | 158,346 | +15.3% |
| 2006 | 198,636 | +25.4% |
| 2011 | 219,467 | +10.5% |
| 2016 | 250,217 | +14.0% |

At the time of the 2006 National Census, the city's population was 198,636 in 55,943 households. The following census in 2011 counted 219,467 people in 67,069 households. The 2016 census measured the population of the city as 250,217 people in 81,572 households.

Babol is one of the most important cities in the north of Iran, known as a regional center for education, trade, industry, and medical services. It is famous for its orange groves.

== Geography ==
=== Location ===
Babol is in the north of Iran, north-east of Tehran, between the northern slopes of the Alborz Mountains and southern coast of the Caspian Sea.The city is located approximately 20 kilometers south of the Caspian Sea on the west bank of Babolrud River. Babol borders Babolsar and Fereydunkenar to the north, Qaem Shahr and Shirgah District to the east, Savadkuh to the southeast, Firuzkuh to the South and Amol to the west. Babol University is famous for its spectacular scenery.

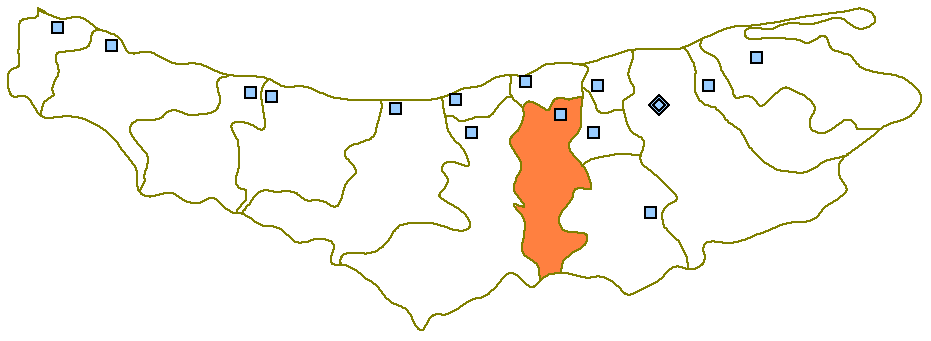
Map showing the location of Babol county as well as Babol city in Mazandaran.

=== Climate ===
The city receives abundant annual rainfall. The Köppen-Geiger climate classification system classifies its climate as Mediterranean climate (Köppen: Csa, Trewartha: Cs).

Climate data for Babol
| Month | Jan | Feb | Mar | Apr | May | Jun | Jul | Aug | Sep | Oct | Nov | Dec | Year |
|---|---|---|---|---|---|---|---|---|---|---|---|---|---|
| Mean daily maximum °C (°F) | 12.1 (53.8) | 12.3 (54.1) | 14.5 (58.1) | 19.7 (67.5) | 24.9 (76.8) | 29.3 (84.7) | 31.8 (89.2) | 31.4 (88.5) | 28.9 (84.0) | 23.9 (75.0) | 19.1 (66.4) | 14.5 (58.1) | 21.9 (71.4) |
| Daily mean °C (°F) | 7.8 (46.0) | 8.3 (46.9) | 10.8 (51.4) | 15.6 (60.1) | 20.7 (69.3) | 25.1 (77.2) | 27.5 (81.5) | 27.1 (80.8) | 24.4 (75.9) | 19.2 (66.6) | 14.6 (58.3) | 10.0 (50.0) | 17.6 (63.7) |
| Mean daily minimum °C (°F) | 3.6 (38.5) | 4.4 (39.9) | 7.1 (44.8) | 11.6 (52.9) | 16.5 (61.7) | 20.9 (69.6) | 23.3 (73.9) | 22.9 (73.2) | 20.0 (68.0) | 14.6 (58.3) | 10.2 (50.4) | 5.6 (42.1) | 13.4 (56.1) |
| Average precipitation mm (inches) | 84.3 (3.32) | 59.6 (2.35) | 59.9 (2.36) | 27.7 (1.09) | 16.8 (0.66) | 17.4 (0.69) | 21.2 (0.83) | 52.2 (2.06) | 71.4 (2.81) | 141.8 (5.58) | 103.9 (4.09) | 114.1 (4.49) | 770.3 (30.33) |
| Average precipitation days | 10 | 8.9 | 10.7 | 7.8 | 6 | 4.3 | 4.3 | 6.7 | 6.7 | 8.1 | 8.3 | 9.9 | 91.7 |
| Average relative humidity (%) | 83.4 | 81.4 | 80.5 | 77.6 | 74.6 | 71.4 | 72.6 | 74.6 | 76.1 | 78.3 | 81.4 | 84 | 78.0 |
| Average dew point °C (°F) | 5.2 (41.4) | 5.3 (41.5) | 7.6 (45.7) | 11.7 (53.1) | 16 (61) | 19.6 (67.3) | 22.1 (71.8) | 22.2 (72.0) | 19.9 (67.8) | 15.3 (59.5) | 11.4 (52.5) | 7.4 (45.3) | 13.6 (56.6) |
| Mean monthly sunshine hours | 142.6 | 138.4 | 145.7 | 183 | 238.7 | 273 | 269.7 | 238.7 | 213 | 189.1 | 162 | 142.6 | 2,336.5 |
| Mean daily sunshine hours | 4.6 | 4.9 | 4.7 | 6.1 | 7.7 | 9.1 | 8.7 | 7.7 | 7.1 | 6.1 | 5.4 | 4.6 | 6.4 |
| Percentage possible sunshine | 42.5 | 42 | 37 | 43.5 | 51.4 | 58.6 | 56.6 | 53.3 | 53 | 50 | 47.9 | 43.1 | 48.2 |
Source: 'Weatherbase Weather2visit

== Economy ==
Commerce and trading are the backbone of the city's economy since it is the largest commercial center for Mazandaran province, partially due to its location at the center of the province and also the large population of villages around the city, making Babol county the most populated county in the province. Babol produces food and textiles — as well as other processed goods, including oranges, lemons, and tangerines. There are many rice farms around the city, and, until about 20 years ago, tea, tobacco, and cotton were processed.

The city is served by Refah Chain Stores Co., Iran Hyper Star, Isfahan City Center, Shahrvand Chain Stores Inc., Kowsar Market, Ofoq Kourosh chain store.

== Transportation ==
Almost all of the city transportation is by car, buses and other road vehicles. Thus, Babol is highly dependent on the regional highway network which connects the city to Babolsar 10 km north, Amol 30 km west and Qaemshahr 15 km east. These are all new wide highways.

Babol has access to an airport 55 km away and to a train station 15 km away.

The ports of Fereydunkenar and Babolsar are both located on the southern coast of the Caspian Sea with connection to other Caspian ports.

== Colleges and universities ==
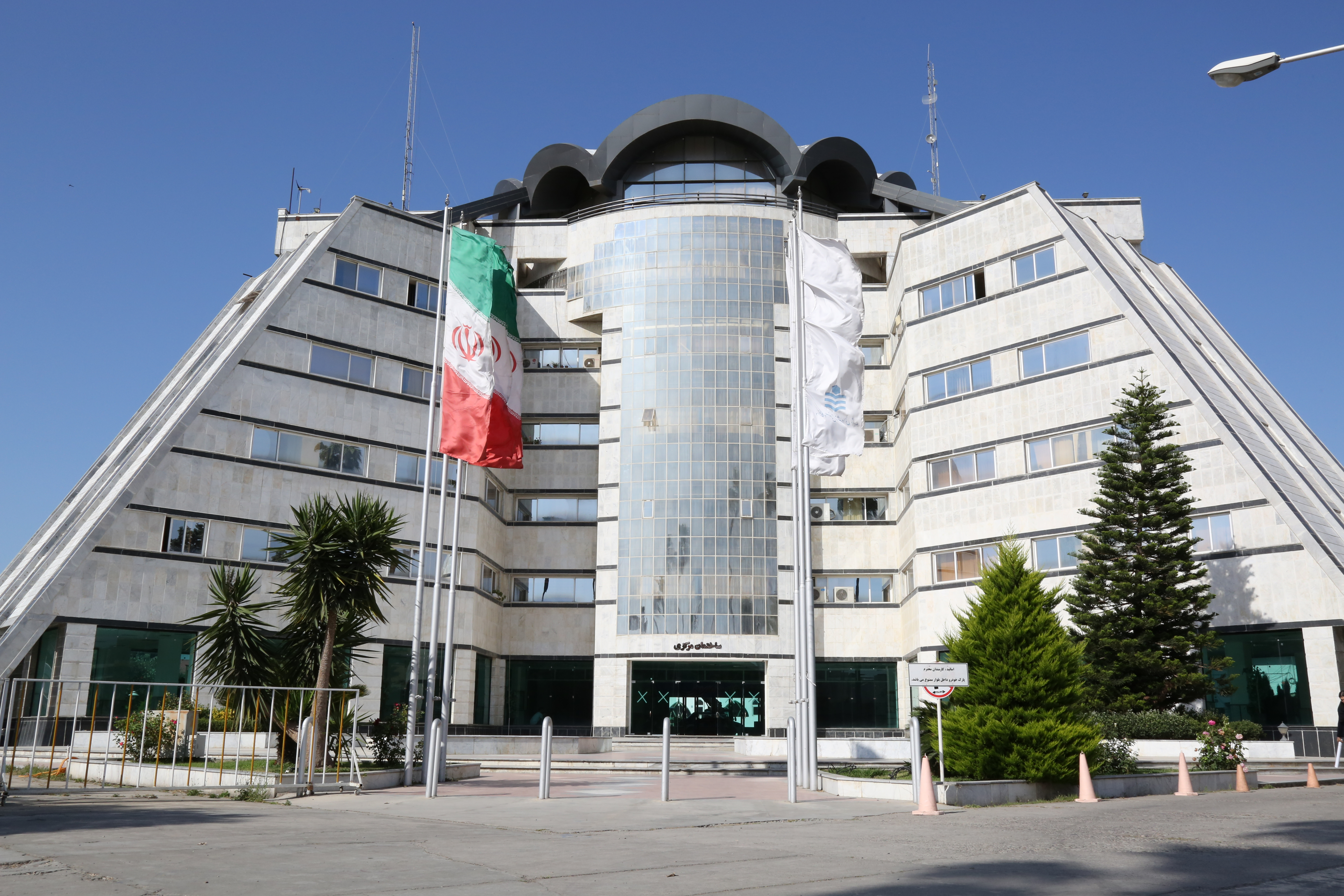
Noshirvani University of Technology

As the largest commercial center, the city of Babol also hosts large number of universities province. Universities include:

- Babol Noshirvani University of Technology The university is an influential center for academic research in Iran, due to which it has been consistently ranked among the top schools in the country. BNUT is currently ranked 1st among all Iranian universities according to Times Higher Education (THE) World University Rankings. THE has also ranked BNUT between 351st and 400th among world universities, 55th among the world's young universities, as well as 43rd among Asian universities.
- Babol University of Medical Sciences
- Mazandaran University of Science and Technology
- Educators University - Education Center Martyr Rajai Babol
- PNU - Babol Center
- PNU - Bandpey Unit
- Islamic Azad University - Babol Unit
- University of Applied Science - Babol Unit
- Babol Vocational College of Imam Sadiq
- Mazandaran Institute of Technology
- Rahedanesh Institute of Higher Education
- Tabari Institute of Higher Education
- Aryan Institute of Science and Technology
- Institute of Applied Science of Art and Culture - Unit 4 Of Babol
- Institute of Applied Science Technology Jahad Daneshgahi
- Institute of Applied Science -Unit Of Western Bandpey
- Vocational College of Sama - Babol Unit
- Vocational College of AzZahra - Babol Unit

== Health centers and hotels ==
- Negin Hotel
- Reza Hotel
- Marjan Hotel
- Ayatollah Rouhani Hospital
- Babol Clinic
- Shahid Beheshti Hospital
- Fatemeh Al-Zahra Hospital
- Yahya Nejad Hospital
- 17 Shahrivar Hospital
- Mehregan Hospital

== Industry ==
=== Major corporations ===
- Iran Khodro Mazandaran
- Babol Machine Mfg. & Ind
- MSco
- Khazar Khodro Babol.Co

== Sports ==
Babol is home to the Iranian Basketball Super League team BEEM Mazandaran BC which plays in the city's Shahid Sojoodi Arena. BEEM also had a popular volleyball team in the Iranian Super League in 2008–2009. Now Babol have a 2 Team in wrestling, Bime Razi and Arash Zin. They have a popular football club, Khooneh Be Khooneh. Khooneh Be Khooneh play in the 1st division (after Premier League) in the Iranian system football. Babol was the host of Freestyle Wrestling Club World Cup in December 2018.

== Landmarks ==
The ruins of Shah Abbas I's palace are located in the city. Mohammad Hassan Khan bridge is also one of the most ancient buildings of Mazandaran. It was built by the king Mohammad Hassan Khan Qajar, the ancestor of Agha Mohammad Khan Qajar as the main road from Babol to Amol. Now it is known as the old road of Babol to Amol. Babol also contains Babol Noshirvani Park, the largest park including a playground located in the northern part of Iran, located in the vicinity of Caspian Sea. Babol is home to many important and intact forests and jungles, such as, Shiadeh, in south-east Babol.

Filband, a village near the northern Iranian city of Babol, is famous for its skies which are full of interconnected cumulus clouds, especially in springtime.

== Historical and natural attractions ==
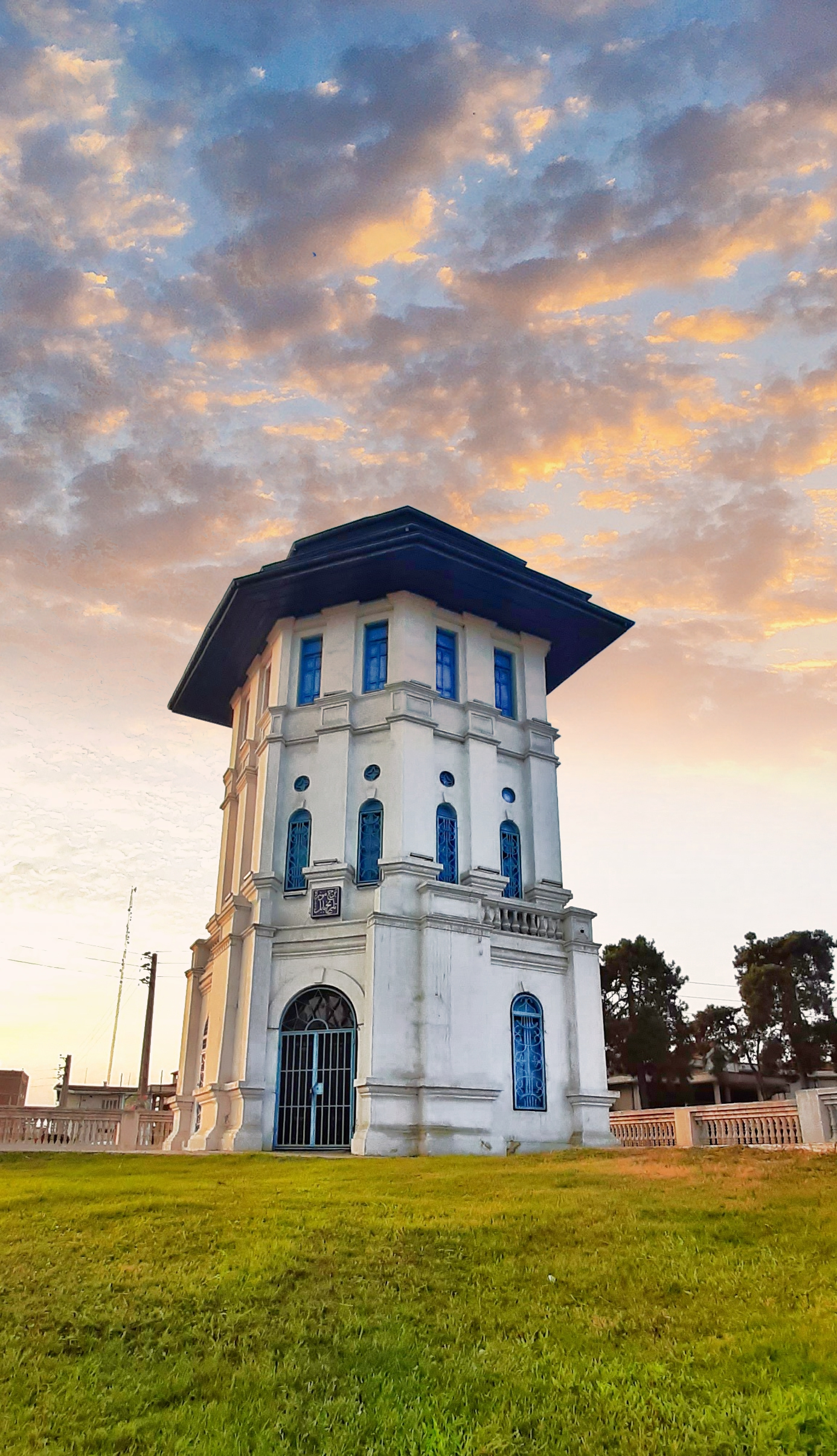
Borje didebani

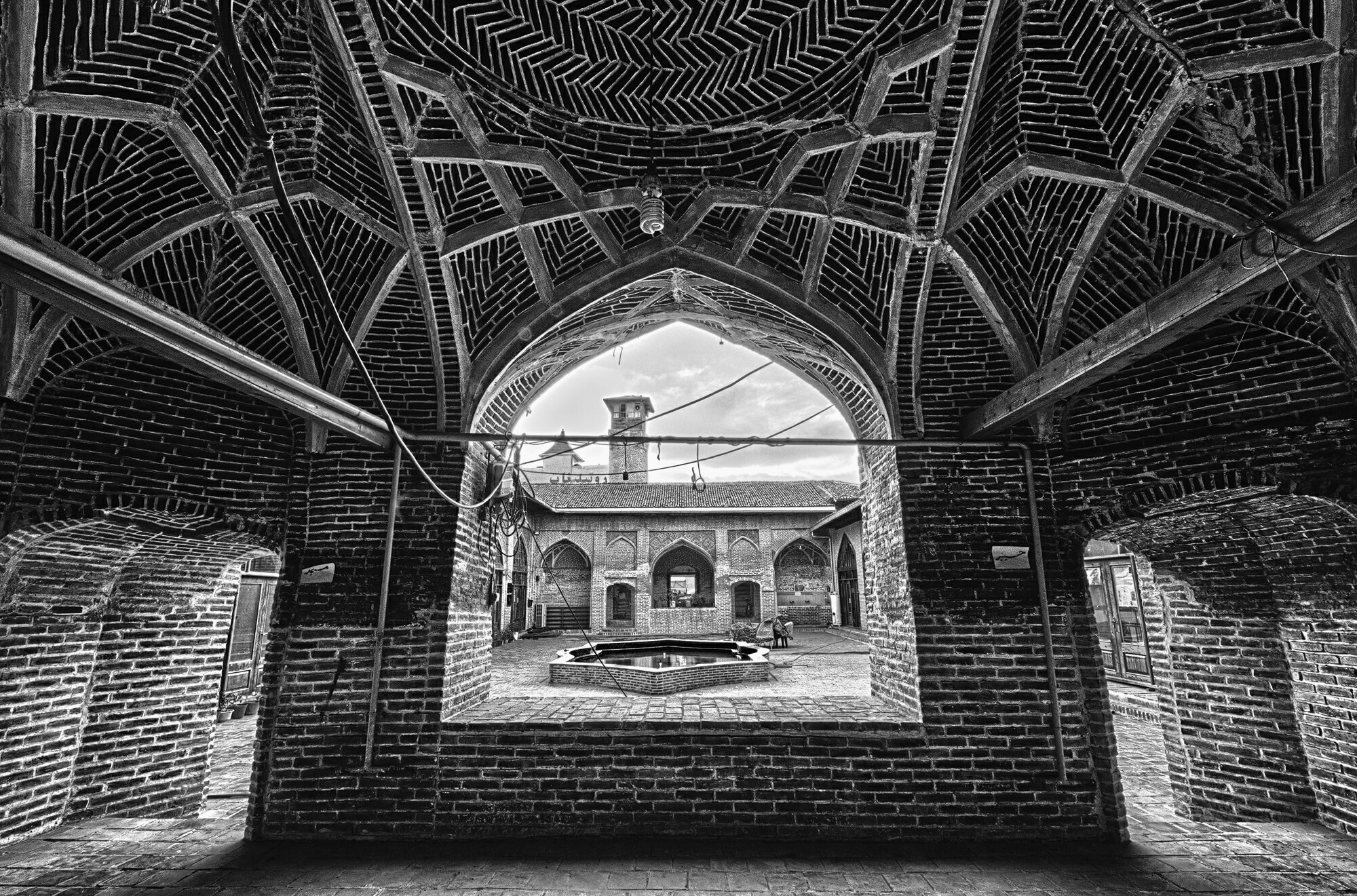
Babol Jameh Mosque

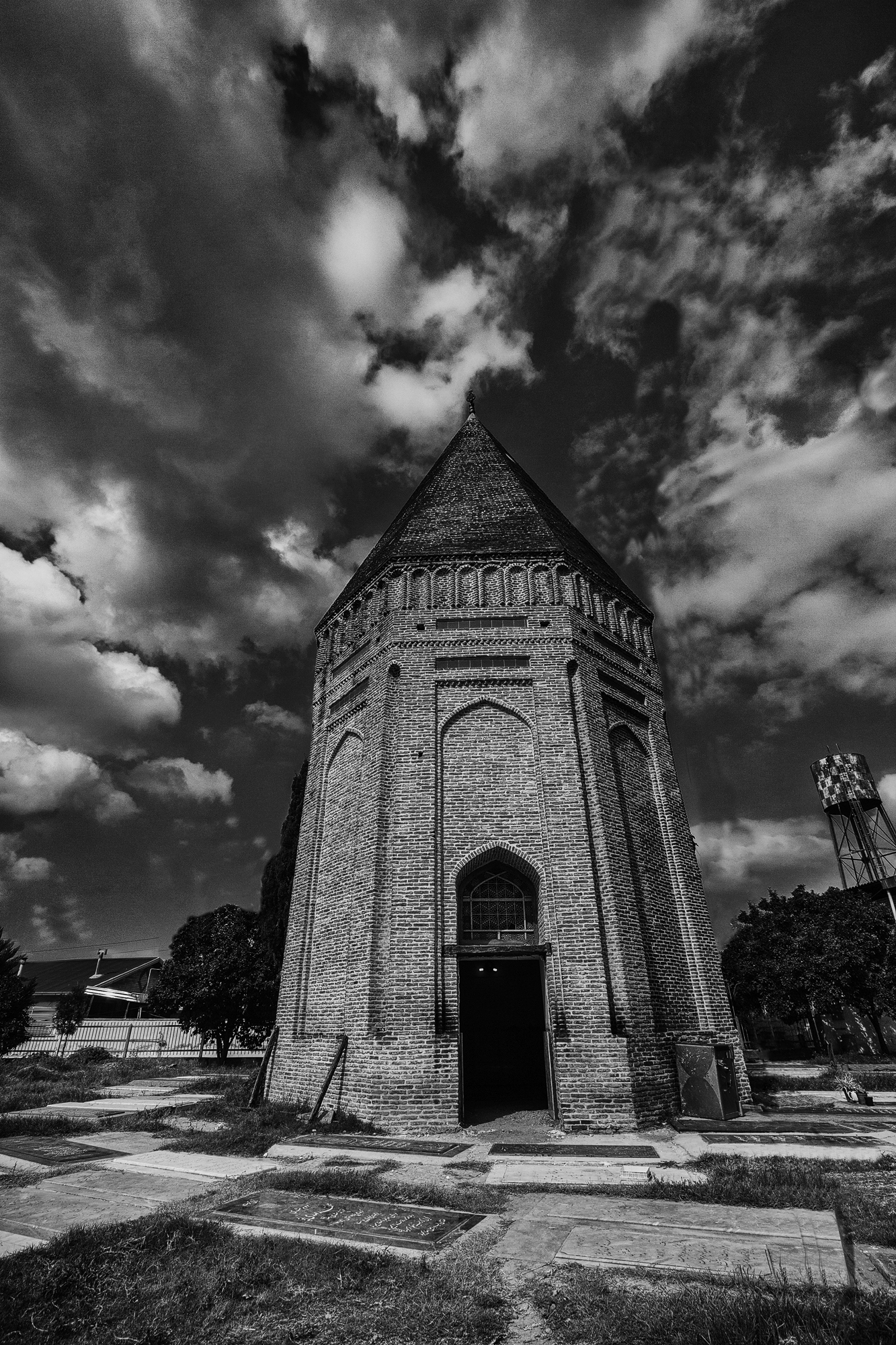
Sultan Mohamad Taher Tomb Tower

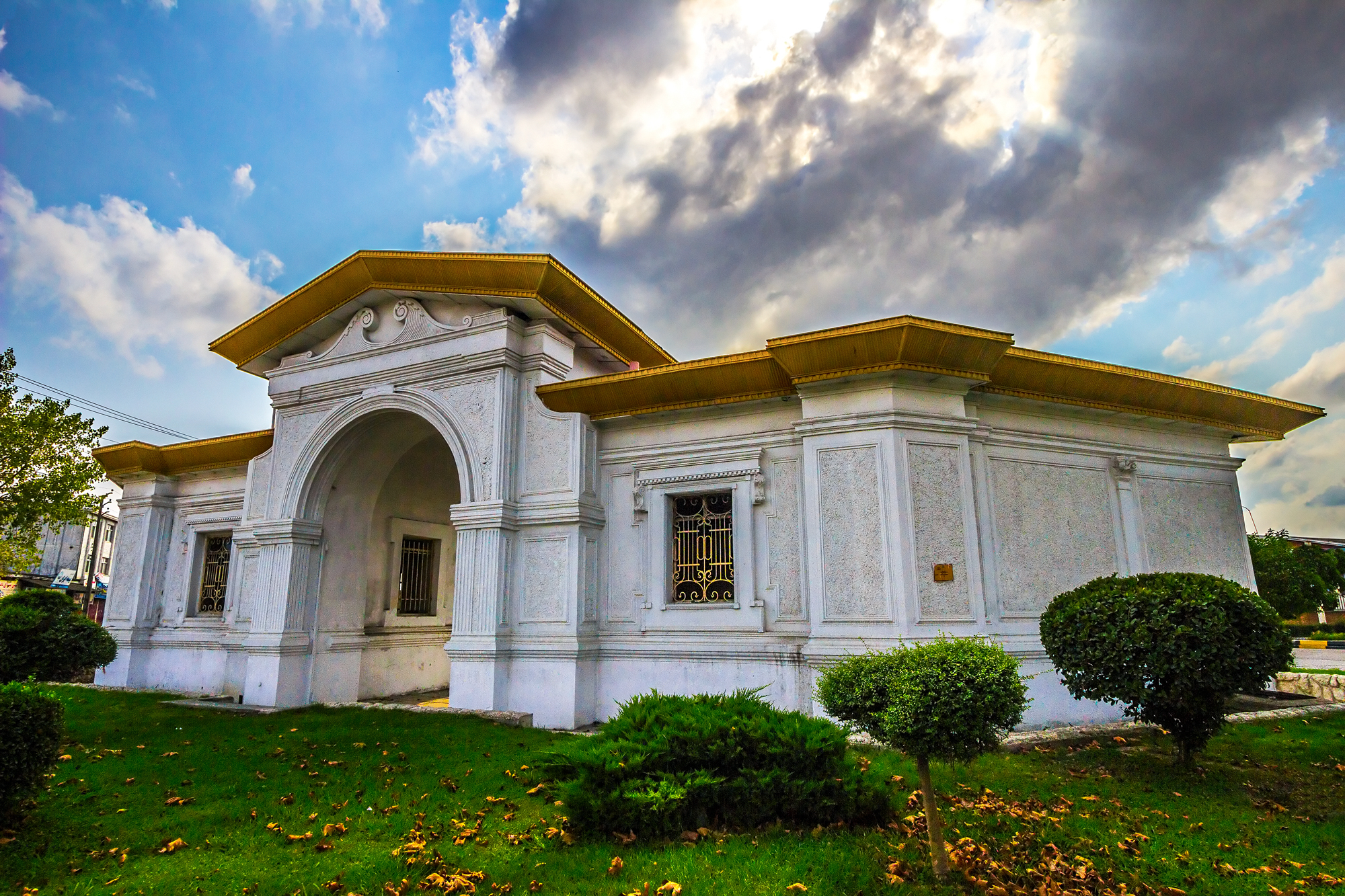
Entrance of the Medical Sciences University of Babol

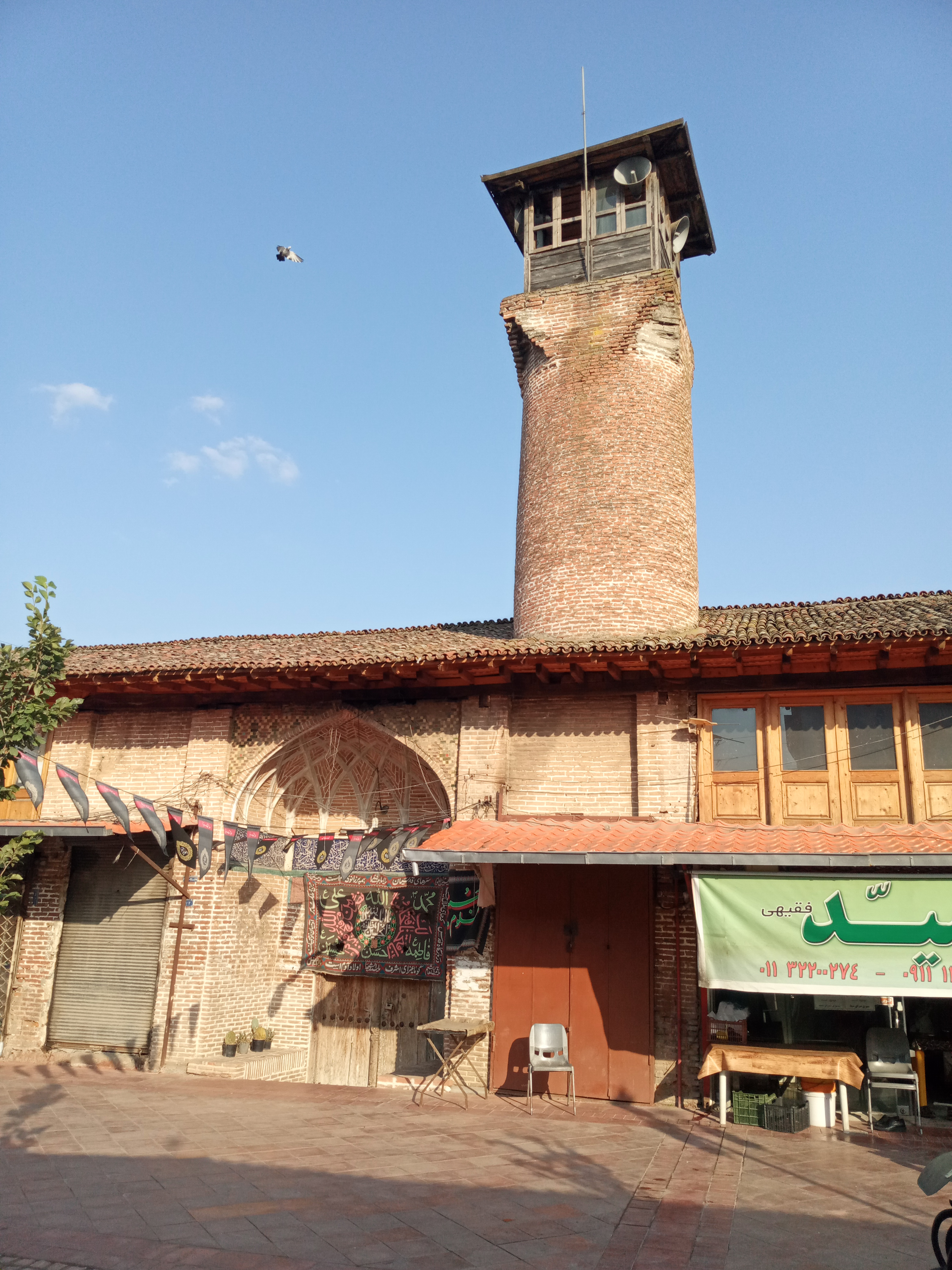
Jameh Mosque

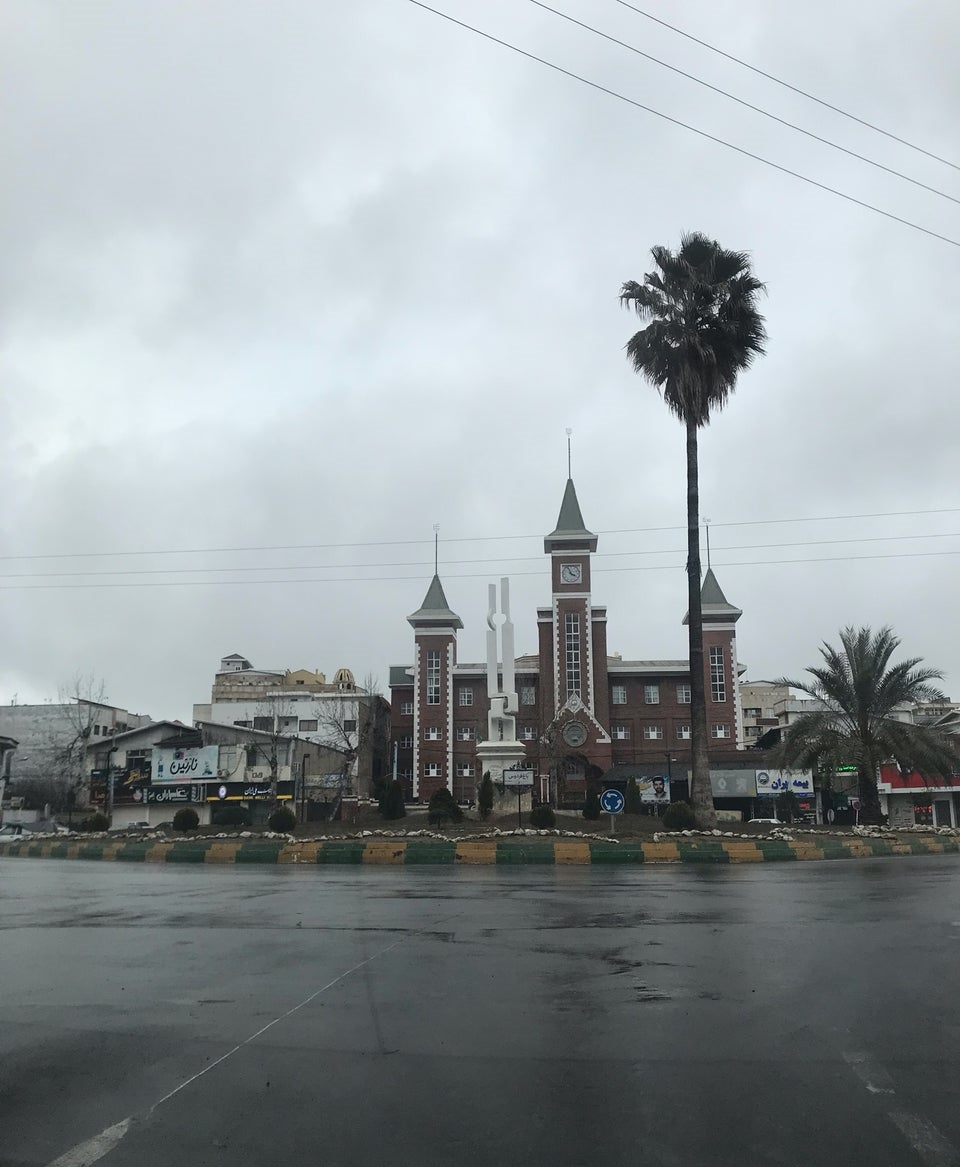
Bagh-e Ferdous

- Mohammad Hassan Khan bridge
- Babol Museum
- Emamzadeh Ghasem
- Kazem Beik Mosque
- Watchtower
- Babol Jameh Mosque
- Mohaddesin Mosque
- Tekyeh Moghri Kola
- Post Building
- Head University of Medical Sciences
- Ibn Shahr Ashub Tomb
- Darvish Alam-bazi Tower
- Hasirforoshan Mosque
- Babolroud
- Babolkenar Forest Park
- Historic homes Qajansb
- Aghajan Nasab House
- Osia House
- Najafi Mansion
- Shiadeh Dam
- Saghanefar Kija Tekyeh
- Porang High School
- Shiadeh Saghanefar
- Abuol Hasan Kola Saghanefar
- Mulana Mosque
- Tirkan Waterfall
- Haft Waterfall
- Filband Village
- Bandpey Village
- Pir Alam Tekyeh
- Moftakher ul-Mamalek Caravanserai
- Sadr Hawza
- Chahar Suq Mosque
- Bagh-e Ferdows
- Noshirvani Park

== Notable people ==
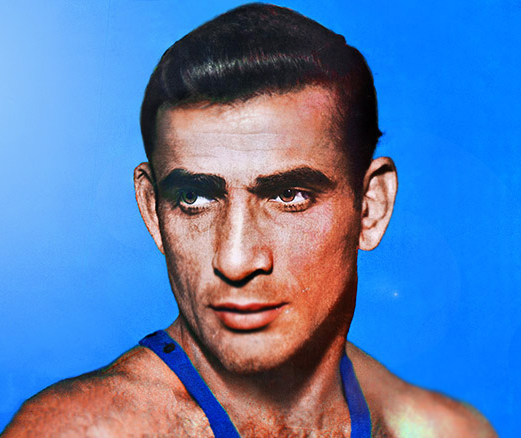
Emam-Ali Habibi

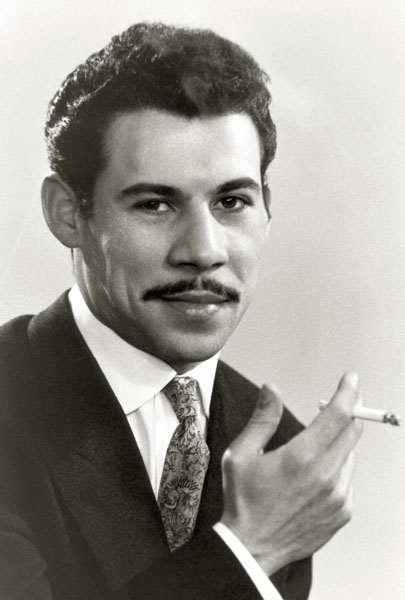
Davoud Rashidi

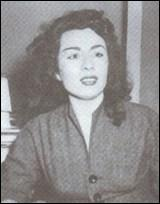
Delkash

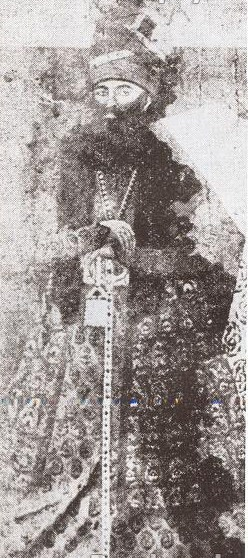
Mirza Shafi Mazandarani

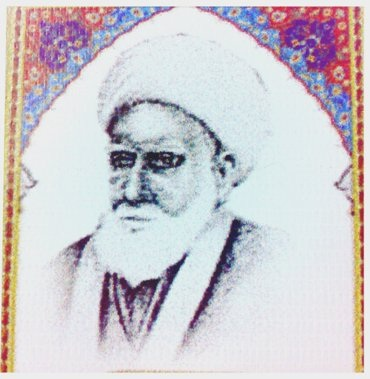
Ali Asghar Mazandarani

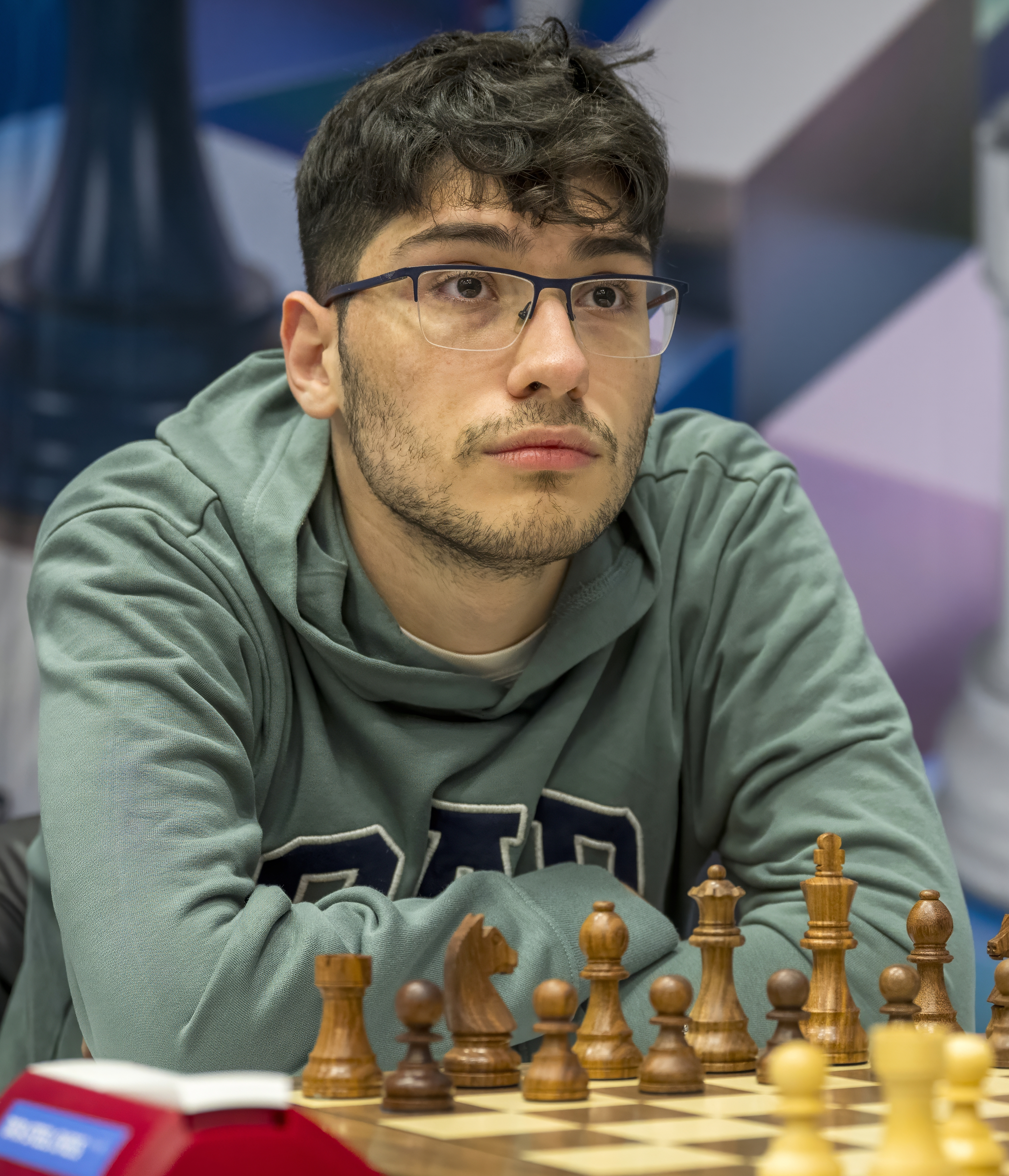
Alireza Firouzja

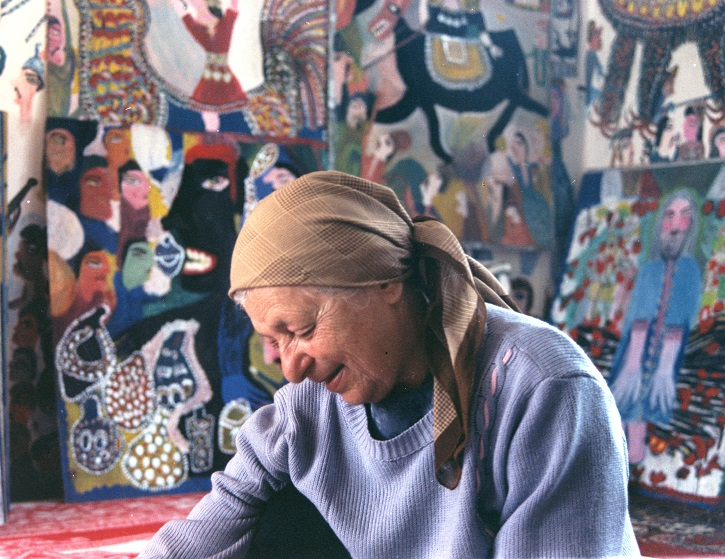
Mokarrameh Ghanbari

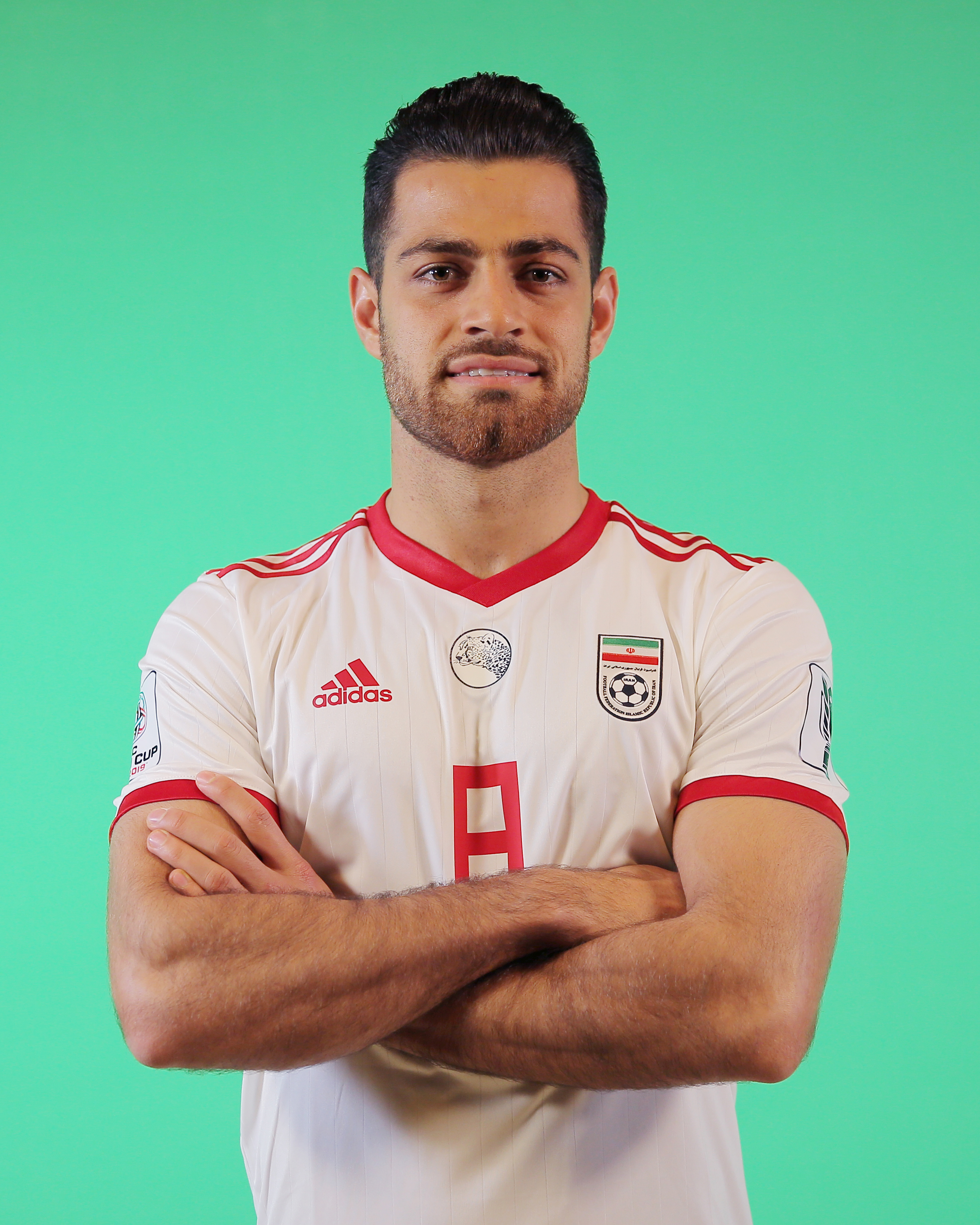
Morteza Pouraliganji

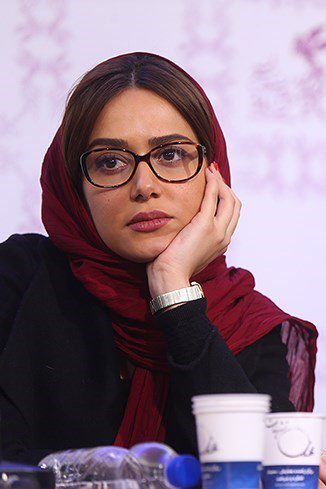
Parinaz Izadyar

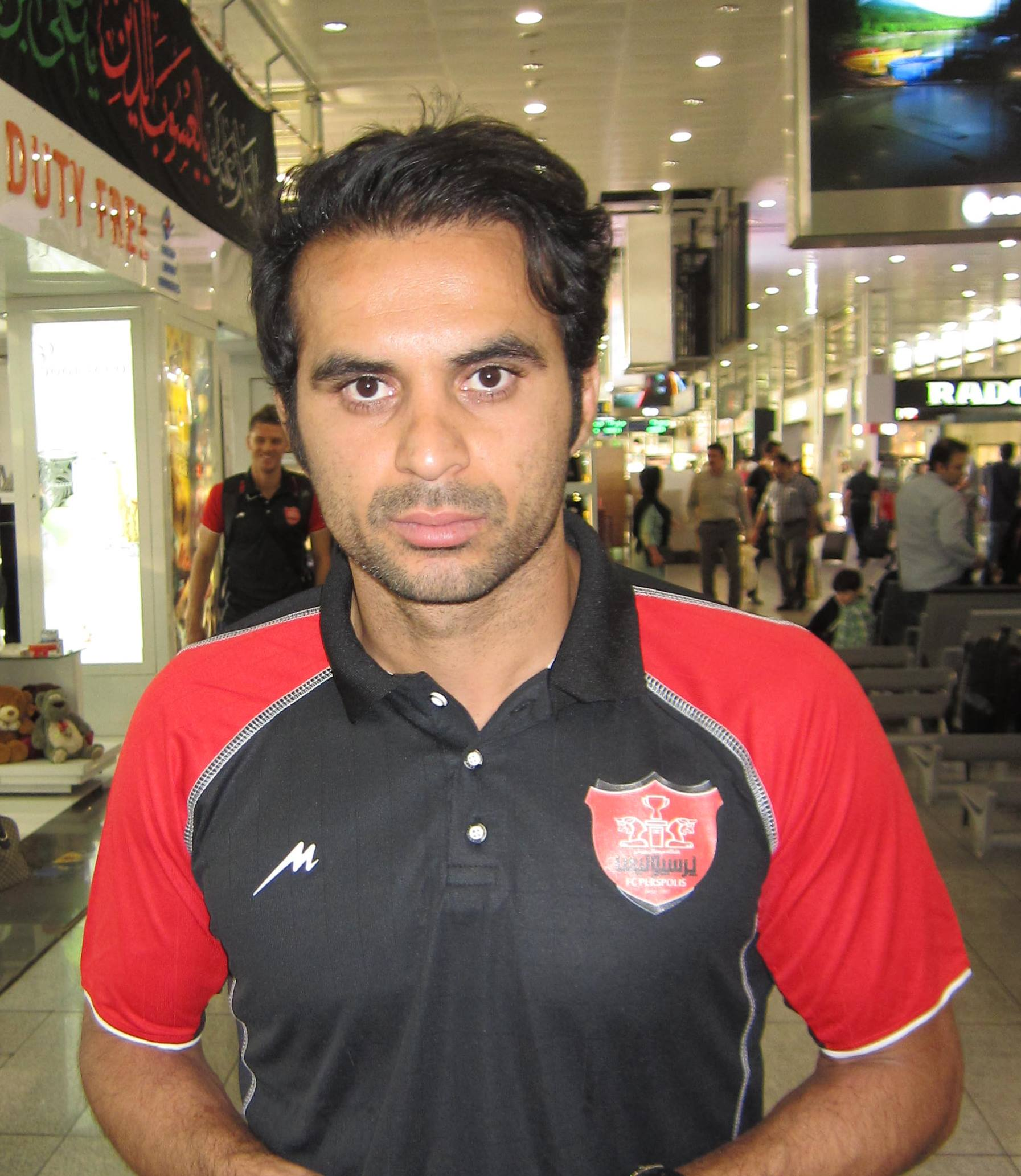
Hadi Norouzi

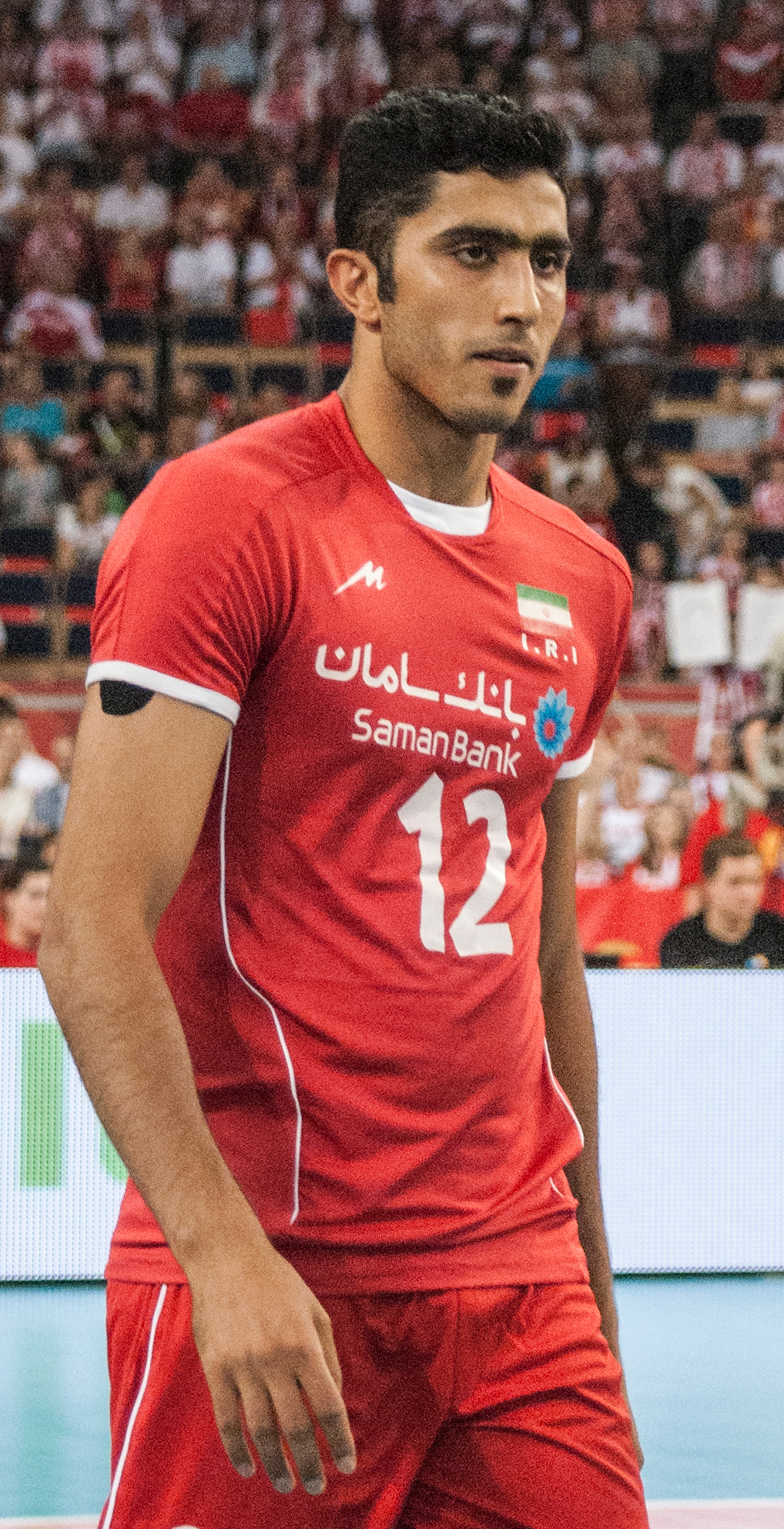
Mojtaba Mirzajanpour

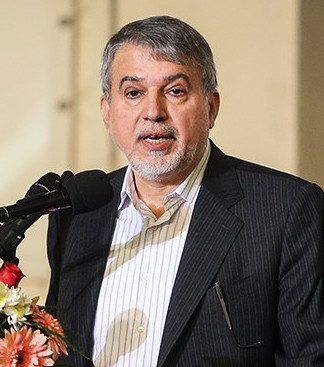
Reza Salehi Amiri

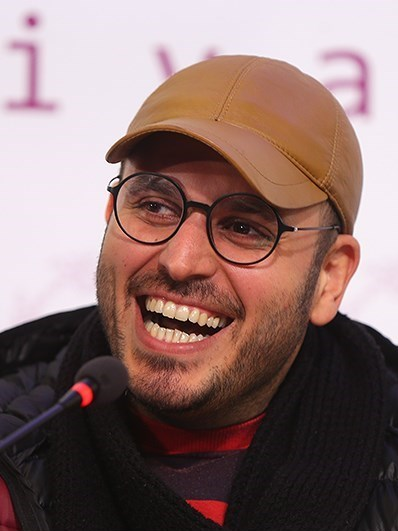
Mohammad Hossein Mahdavian

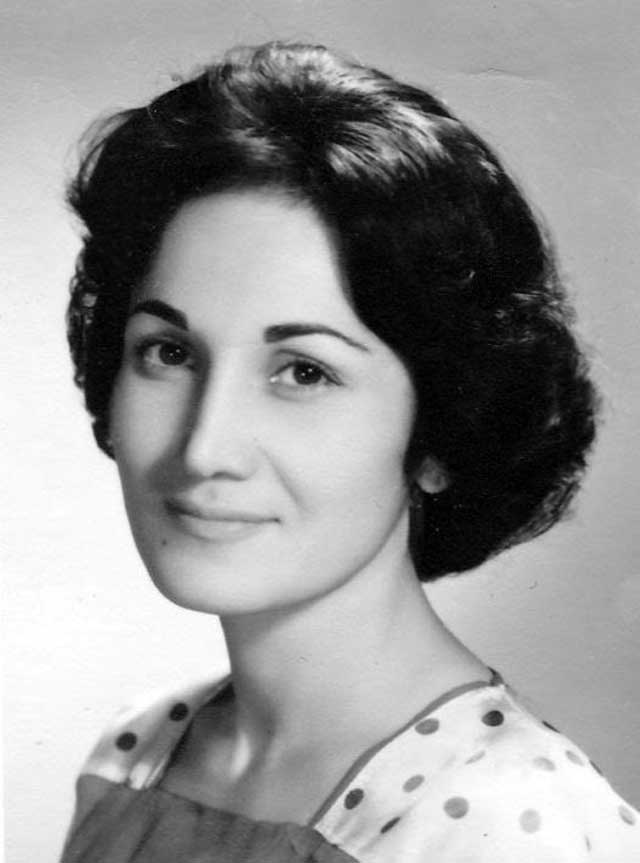
Talat Basari

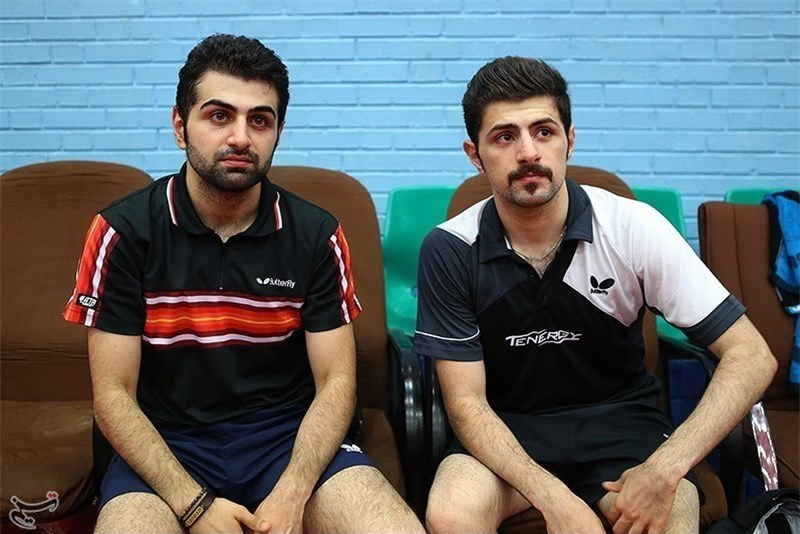
Noshad & Nima Alamian

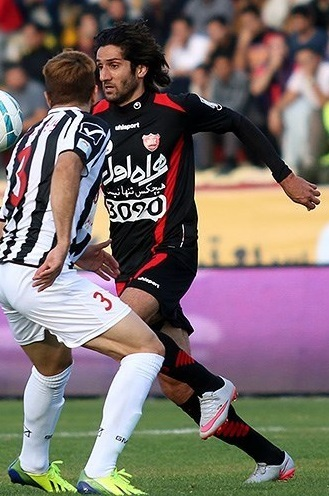
Reza Khaleghifar

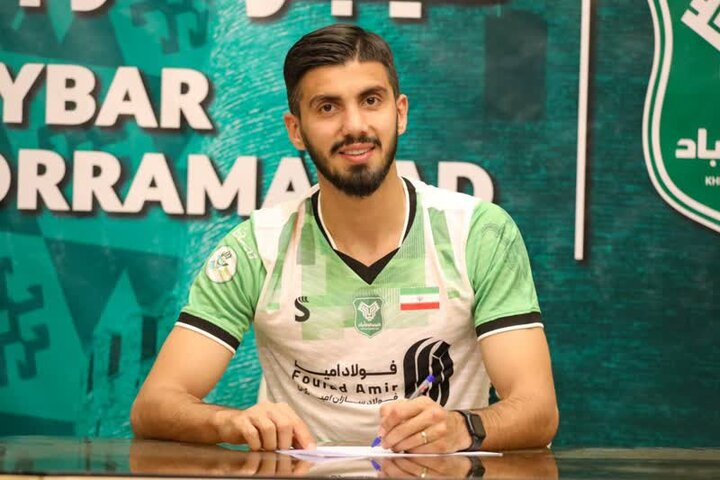
Mohammad Aghajanpour

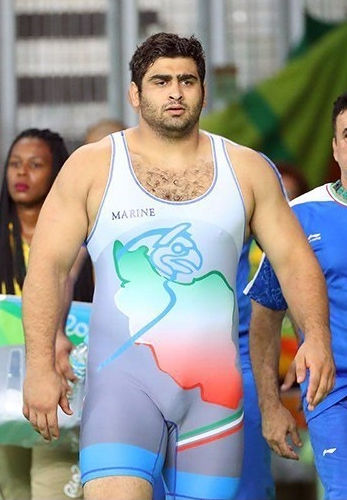
Bashir Babajanzadeh

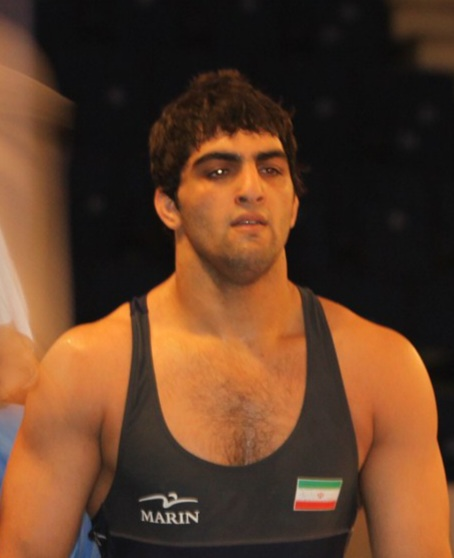
Hamed Talebi

Abbas Foroutan

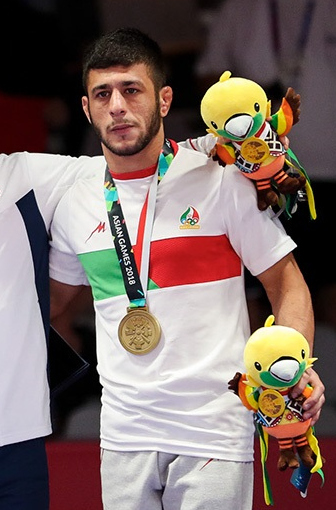
Reza Atri

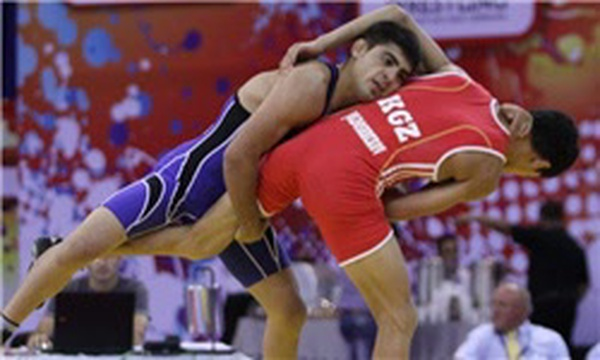
Ali Mohammadzadeh

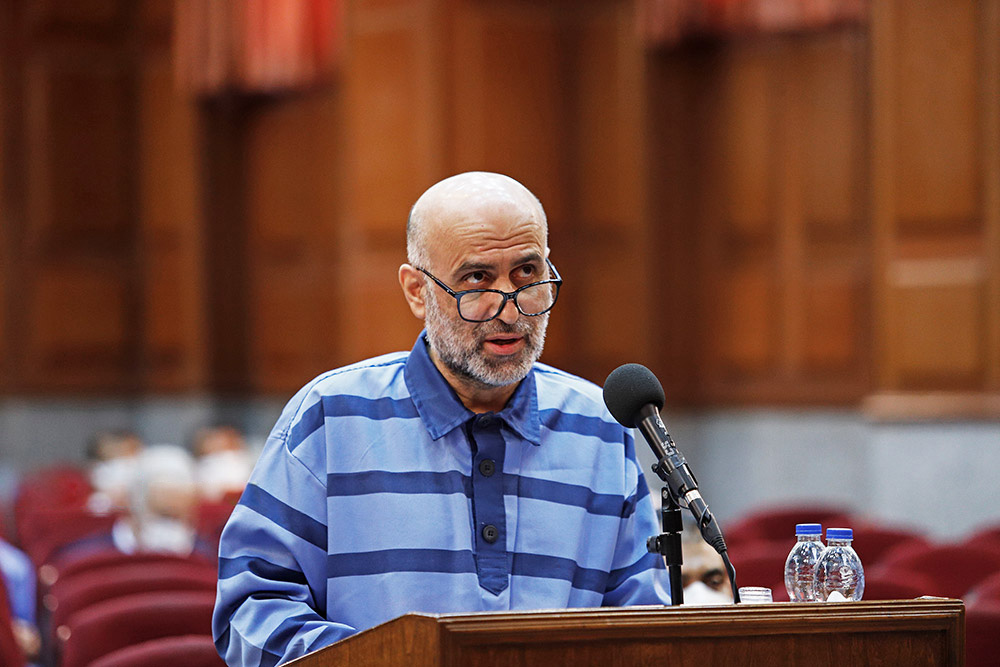
Akbar Tabari

- Quddús or Mullá Muḥammad ʻAlí-i-Bárfurúshi (c.1820-1849) – the most prominent disciple of the Báb.
- Afshin (born 1978) – singer
- Nima Alamian (born 1992) – table tennis player
- Noshad Alamian (born 1991) – table tennis player
- Masih Alinejad (born 1976) – journalist
- Reza Salehi Amiri (born 1962) – politician
- Hassan Anousheh (born 1945) – writer
- Arya Aramnejad (born 1983) – singer
- Muhammad Ashrafi (1804–1898) – Shia Marja'
- Bashir Babajanzadeh (born 1989) – wrestler
- Hamed Talebi (born 1991) – wrestler
- Reza Atri (born 1994) – wrestler
- Parviz Bahram (1933–2019) – dubber
- Mohammad-Ali Barfrushi (1820–1849) – Babi leader
- Tal'at Basari (born 1925) – feminist writer
- Hamid Reza Chitgar (1949–1987) – politician
- Delkash (1924–2004) – singer
- Sohrab Entezari (born 1977) – football player
- Alireza Firouzja (born 2003) – chess player
- Emam-Ali Habibi (born 1931) – wrestler
- Sousan Hajipour (born 1990) – taekwondo practitioner
- Masoud Hedayatifard (born 1971) – scholar in fishery science
- Parinaz Izadyar (born 1985) – actress
- Hossein Fallah Noshirvani (1902–1972) – philanthropist
- Shahrokh Meskoob (1924–2005) – academic and writer
- Alireza Mashaghi (born 1977) – scientist
- Ahmad Ghahreman (1928–2008) – botanist
- Sheikh Mohammad Haeri Mazandarani (1960) – religious
- Zeinolabedin Haeri Mazandarani (1919–1996) – religious
- Ali Asghar Mazandarani (1826–1911) – cleric
- Karim Motamedi (born 1929) – minister
- Hassan Ghashghavi (born 1957) – ambassador
- Maziar (1952–1997) – singer
- Mokarrameh Ghanbari (1928–2005) – painter
- Bijan Mortazavi (born 1957) – singer and musician
- Mohammad Hossein Mahdavian (born 1981) – film director
- Maryam Kavyani (born 1970) – actress
- Mehdi Kheiri (born 1983) – football player
- Hadi Norouzi (1985–2015) – football player
- Mojtaba Mirzajanpour (born 1991) – volleyball player
- Amir Pazevari (17th century) – poet
- Morteza Pouraliganji (born 1992) – football player
- Farhad Rachidi (born 1962) – scientist
- Zeinolabedin Rahnama (1893–1989) – writer
- Davoud Rashidi (1933–2016) – actor
- Leyli Rashidi (born 1973) – actress
- Towhidi Tabari (born 1964) – artist
- Zahra Tabari (born 1958) – electrical engineer and activist sentenced to death by hanging on charges of "armed rebellion" after she was found to possess a cloth printed with the "Woman, Life, Freedom" slogan, held in Lakan Prison since 2025

== See also ==
- Babolsar
- Babolrud
