= Abolfazl Ahoopa =

Iranian wrestler (born 1994)

Personal information
- Native name: ابوالفضل آهوپا
- Full name: Abolfazl Ahoupa
- Nationality: Iranian
- Born: February 17, 1994 (age 32) Babol, Mazandaran, Iran
- Occupation: Amateur wrestler
- Height: 1.80 m (5 ft 11 in)
- Weight: 80 kg (176 lb)

Sport
- Country: Iran
- Sport: Wrestling
- Event: Freestyle
- Club: Azadgan Babol
- Coached by: Ali Shokripour
Medal record
Representing Iran
Men's freestyle wrestling
World Beach Championships
Gold medal – first place	2015 Mangalia	80 kg

Abolfazl Ahoupa (Persian: ابوالفضل آهوپا; born 17 February 1994 in Babol)is an Iranian freestyle wrestler. He won the gold medal in the 80 kg weight class at the 2015 Cadet Beach Wrestling World Championships in Mangalia, Romania.
