= Seyed Naser Emadi =

Iranian dermatologist, researcher and humanitarian physician

Seyed Naser Emadi Chashmi
- سید ناصر عمادی چاشمی
- Born: 1966 (age 59–60); Qaemshahr, Mazandaran, Iran
- Education: Babol University of Medical Sciences; Tehran University of Medical Sciences
- Occupations: Dermatologist, humanitarian physician
- Employer: Tehran University of Medical Sciences
- Awards: Florence Nightingale Medal (2021)

Seyed Naser Emadi Chashmi (Persian: سید ناصر عمادی چاشمی; born 1966) is an Iranian dermatologist, medical researcher, and humanitarian physician. He is a faculty member at the Tehran University of Medical Sciences (TUMS) and a clinician at Razi Hospital and the Imam Khomeini Hospital Complex. Emadi is widely recognized for his volunteer medical missions in Iran and Africa. In 2021, he received the Florence Nightingale Medal for exceptional humanitarian medical service.

== Early life and education ==
Emadi was born in 1966 in Qaemshahr, Mazandaran Province, Iran. He earned his Doctor of Medicine (M.D.) degree from the Babol University of Medical Sciences. He later completed his specialization in dermatology at the Tehran University of Medical Sciences.

== Medical and academic career ==
Emadi joined the faculty of Tehran University of Medical Sciences and currently practices dermatology at Razi Hospital and the Imam Khomeini Hospital Complex. His clinical and research interests include sulfur mustard–induced skin injuries, cutaneous leishmaniasis, HIV-associated dermatologic disorders, and dermatopathology. He has authored and co-authored numerous peer-reviewed articles in national and international medical journals.

=== Selected publications ===
- Emadi SN, et al. “Cutaneous manifestations of sulfur mustard exposure.” Iranian Journal of Dermatology (2013).
- Emadi SN, et al. “Dermatologic findings in HIV-positive patients in Iran.” Journal of Infectious Diseases & Therapy (2016).

== Humanitarian activities ==
=== Work in Iran ===
Emadi regularly participates in volunteer medical missions to underserved and rural regions of Iran, providing free dermatologic consultations and treatment. He has also provided long-term dermatologic care for survivors of chemical warfare exposure from the Iran–Iraq War.

=== International missions ===
In 2014, Emadi conducted humanitarian dermatology missions in Burundi, where he provided free treatment and trained local medical staff at Roi Khaled Hospital. He has also participated in international initiatives addressing neglected tropical diseases in Africa.

== Awards and recognition ==
- Florence Nightingale Medal (2021), awarded by the International Committee of the Red Cross for humanitarian medical service.
- National recognition in Iran for volunteer medical and humanitarian activities.
