= Ali Mohammadzadeh =

Iranian freestyle wrestler

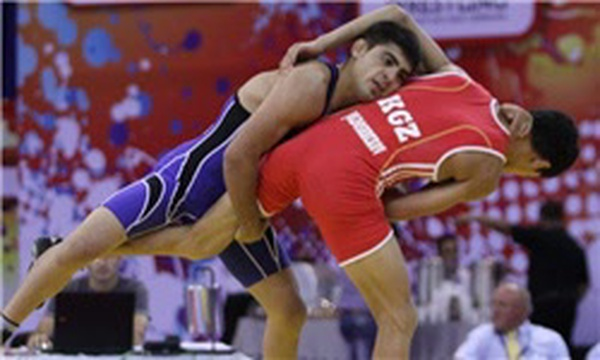
- Ali Mohammadzadeh in 2015

Personal information
- Native name: علی محمدزاده
- Full name: Ali Mohammadzadeh Nagharchi
- Nationality: Iranian
- Born: Babol, Mazandaran, Iran
- Occupation: Amateur wrestler

Sport
- Country: Iran
- Sport: Wrestling
- Event: Freestyle
Medal record
Representing Iran
Men's freestyle wrestling
World Beach Championships
Gold medal – first place	2015 Mangalia	60 kg

Ali Mohammadzadeh Nagharchi (Persian: علی محمدزاده نقارچی) is an Iranian freestyle wrestler. He won the gold medal in the 60 kg weight class at the 2015 Cadet Beach Wrestling World Championships in Mangalia, Romania.
