= Babol Museum =

Museum in Babol, Iran

Coordinates: 36°32′41″N 52°40′35″E

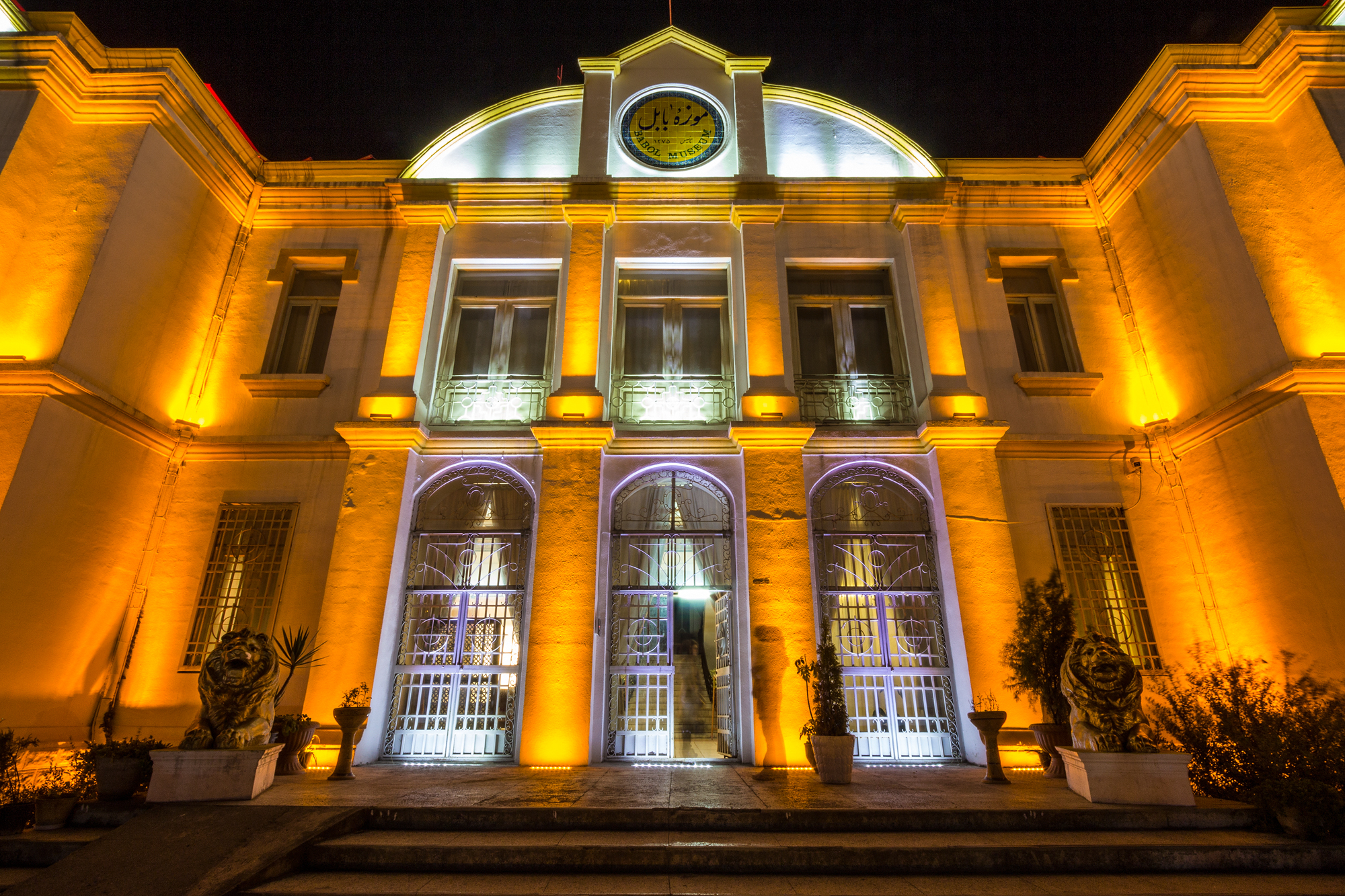
Babol Museum

Babol Museum (full name: Babol Ganjineh Museum), located in the city of Babol in Mazandaran province, Iran, is a history and archaeology museum. It houses thousands of artifacts, including ancient ceramics, coins, manuscripts, and archaeological finds from the Mazandaran region, making it one of the most important cultural institutions in northern Iran.
