= Shahrvand Chain Stores Inc. =

Iranian hypermarket chain

- Company type: Public company, private
- Industry: Retail
- Founded: 1994; 32 years ago
- Headquarters: Tehran, Iran
- Area served: Iran
- Key people: Masoud Sariolghalam, CEO
- Products: Cash and carry/warehouse club, convenience/forecourt store, discount store, hypermarket/supercenter/superstore, supermarket
- Services: Discount; Grocery; Convenience stores Cash and carry Hypermarkets
- Revenue: ▲2.1 trillion IRR (2009)
- Website: www.shahrvand.ir

Shahrvand department stores is an Iranian chain based in Tehran. The establishment currently has 35 branches in Tehran. Shahrvand, along with Refah supermarket and Carrefour-owned Hyperstar Market, create the bulk of the Iranian retail industry.

In 2008, the company teamed with Russian supermarket NEVA-RUS to incorporate the two companies' management techniques.

As of 2010, the department store chain has been owned by the city government of Tehran.
