= Ahmad Ghahreman =

Iranian botanist (1928–2008)

Ahmad Ghahreman (احمد قهرمان, in Persian; 1928, in Babol – November 7, 2008, in Tehran) was an Iranian botanist and a professor at Tehran University.
