= Masoud Hedayatifard =

Iranian scientist

- Born: Babol, Iran
- Scientific career
- Fields: Fisheries Sciences & Technology; Seafood
- Institutions: Islamic Azad University

Masoud Hedayatifard (Persian: مسعود هدایتی‌فرد), born in Babol, (Mazandaran, Northern province), Iran, is a specialist in fishery science and industries. Since 1997, he is a faculty member of the Islamic Azad University. Hedayatifard has published more than 215 scientific articles on aquatic areas in English and Persian and some of them have been re-indexed in ISI journals, ScienceAlert, ISC journals, academic journals, and SID Journals.
