= Arya Aramnejad =

Iranian singer

Arya Aramnejad is an Iranian singer from Babol, Iran. He became known for his song "Ali Barkhiz," which denounces the Islamic regime's crimes during the 2009 Ashura protests. After this, he was jailed and tortured. He was then released and sentenced to one year in prison.

He sang several other songs for the Green Movement of Iran including "Yek rooze khoob" (a good day), "Baraye Lamse Azadi" (for a touch of freedom), "Deltangi" (nostalgia). In December 2010, he had an interview with the Spanish newspaper El País where he talked about his tortures again, saying, "We have to be the voice of the political prisoners."

Aramnejad was arrested again on 8 November 2011 after continuing to perform political songs, including one which voiced support for Mir-Hossein Mousavi, who served as the last Prime Minister of Iran and ran as a reformist candidate in the 2009 presidential election. He spent six months in Babol in the Intelligence Ministry's detention center and 34 days of solitary confinement in Mati Kola Prison.

Aramnejad began a residency with ICORN (International Cities of Refuge Network) in Stockholm in 2017.

== Ali Barkhiz ==
This is the song written by Mohammad Ghorbani "bidad" and sung by Arya, which has been deemed to 'endanger the national security of the country':

Arya Aramnejad- Ali Barkhiz

English translation of it:

English translation of Ali Barkhiz

== Court Defense ==
Here is his defense against the court:

(Translation by Potkin Azarmehr)

I am standing before you in this court so that the Almighty will be a witness before you and I. A witness to what is happening today to our beloved Iran and to its brave sons and daughters. So that upon the judgement day when we are held accountable, those of us who stand proud and those of us who hold our heads down will remember that such is destiny. The final reward and punishment is only by God.

If justice was the benchmark, instead of me standing trial today, it should have been those who have disgraced Iran and Islam who should have been standing trial. The very people who want to plunder Iran's wealth and use Islam to cover up their foray and despotism.

I was arrested on 15 February when the intelligence ministry agents broke into my house. They smashed up our furniture and rummaged through our belongings just to maximise their intimidation. This was all because of a song I had written that according to the gentlemen had 'endangered the national security'. After that, I spent 44 days in solitary confinement where I was put under a series of emotional, mental and physical tortures. Allow me to describe just a small part of what I was put through:

- Hurling insults and profanities to belittle me, even ridiculing the way I looked- Intimidating me by threatening to arrest my wife, even though she has had no political activities or played a role in anything I have done- Insulting my war veteran brother and threatening to arrest him as well if I did not co-operate- Intelligence agent threatening me with death (He said to me I can easily kill you outside here with a single bullet and no one can question me)- Prison officials threatening me with execution- Keeping me in a 2 metre by 1.5 metre cell without any hygiene facilities that led to infected boils all over my body- Deliberate negligence in giving me my medication related to my heart problem- Putting me in a cell next to an inmate with AIDS and making me walk with bare feet on his blood after he had committed suicide by slashing his wrists- Giving me insinuating offensive information about my wife- Stripping me naked in front of an agent who was holding a camera in his hand, who kept laughing and asking me 'are you scared?' every time I protested at his immoral behaviour- Severe physical beating when I asked to see the prison doctor, beatings so bad that the marks were visible all over me for a long time- Chaining my hands and feet for long periods of time

And these were just a small glimpse of what I went through during my detention.

After the Ashura uprising which resulted in so many of my compatriots being killed, I felt it was my duty to condemn this inhumanity and use my musical talents in doing so. I wrote and composed a song, which became known as 'Ali, Rise up'. The content of this song is to do with the exploitation of God, the Koran and the Imams by a bunch of impostors to achieve their demonic goals. In this song, I asked the Imams for help in uprooting lies and hypocrisy. Is it not strange that in these days to ask the Imams for help in battling against evil is considered a crime in our country?

Imam Hussein was martyred for good to triumph against evil, so should we not expect the same from his followers? Or are we just supposed to ceremoniously beat our heads and beat up our chests and pretend we despise tyrants and despots?

I do not recognise this man as our president! Am I then not a Muslim? On the day of Ashura, I chanted 'God is Great' and I am proud of calling His name. Surely whoever jails me for chanting 'God is Great' is a non-believer and an infidel himself.

Those who make out they are Muslims these days, themselves disregard the most basic teachings. They easily lie to nation of seventy million and make false promises, and feign that they want to glorify Iran and Islam. Iran and Islam are both much grander than having the need for such claimants.

The constitution has to be made clear. It gives me the right to criticise. It gives me the right to take part in gatherings without carrying weapons, it gives me the right to free speech and free thought. And because of this constitution that our fathers voted for, I am free not to be indifferent to the destiny of my country. Interestingly instead of being commended, I have to stand trial today for this.

Sadly in the report made by the intelligence ministry, it is stated that I have written an insulting song against Mu‘āwiya and posted it on my blog. Has the intelligence ministry now become defenders ofMu‘āwiya and Yazid? In another section of the report it says, I made up this song against the Supreme Leader, which is the most comical part of the report. The song is clearly against those who desecrated the sanctities of Ashura, but it seems the intelligence ministry is insistent that someone else is responsible for all this. Such is the illusion of power by those who seek the temporary reins of power.

These policies of mass oppression and intimidation are dictated by which eternal power that justifies silence. Which divine laws allow such invasions of privacy into people's homes and into the privacy of people's private beliefs? and not tolerate the slightest of criticisms? These self-interest seeking persons who claim to be kinder child minders than our own mothers, not only think they own this land but consider any non-conformity a crime and trample on the basic rights of our citizens. I recommend, in a brotherly way, some reality check and some insight than just having your eyes fixated on the seats of power; for rectifying your mistakes in the future will be much harder.

Respected judge, I am worried today about your judgement, for my interrogators said you are their puppet and will do whatever they tell you to do. I hope God will reveal you the truth, so that God forbid, you will not be held accountable for what others have asked you do for them in another world.

In the end, I reject all charges against me and ask you to find me not guilty.
