= Refah Chain Stores Co. =

Iranian supermarket chain

Refah
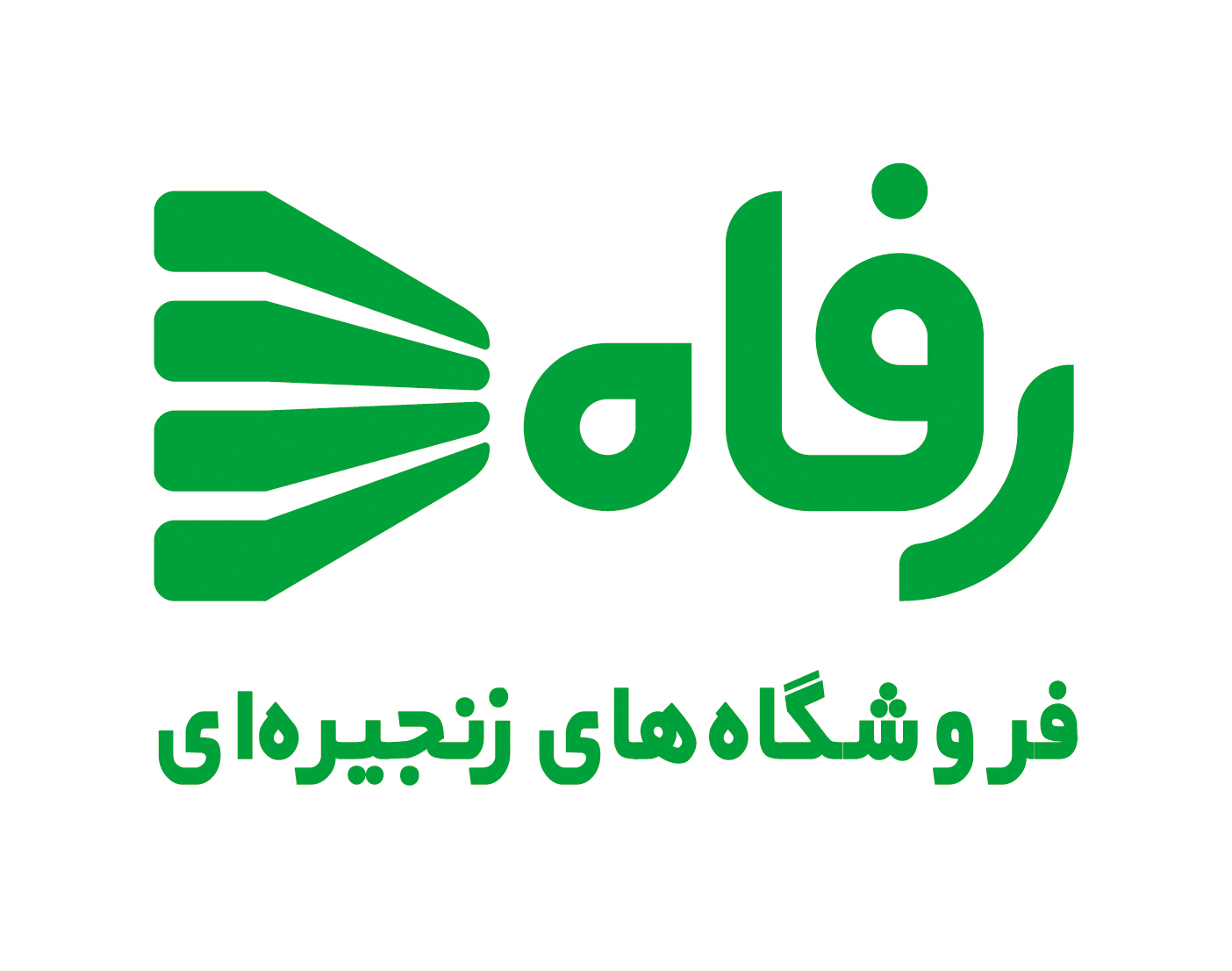

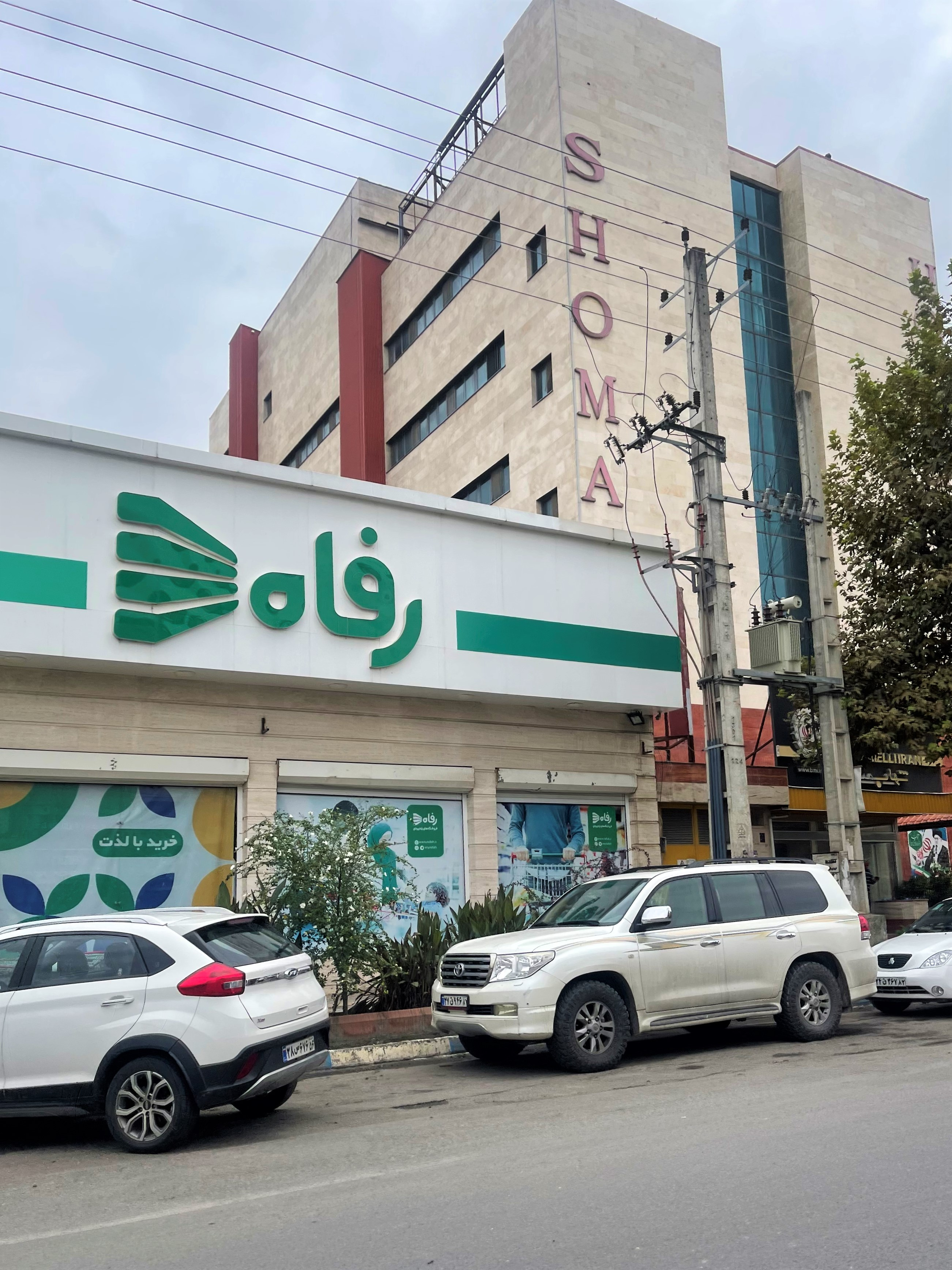
- Type: Public company, Private
- Industry: Retail
- Founded: 16 May 1995; 31 years ago
- Headquarters: Tehran, Iran
- Area served: Worldwide (Iran, Iraq, Turkey, UAE)
- Key people: Rasoul Mohammadi (CEO)
- Products: Cash & Carry/warehouse club, convenience/forecourt store, discount store, hypermarket/supercenter/superstore, supermarket
- Services: Discount; Grocery; Convenience stores Cash and Carry; Hypermarkets
- Revenue: ▲12 Trillion IRR (2009)
- Website: http://www.refah.ir

Refah Supermarkets is an Iranian supermarket chain based in Tehran. The establishment has currently 730 branches across the nation. It also has branches in Iraq and Turkey.

Refah, along with Shahrvand Supermarkets, and Carrefour-owned Hyperstar Market, create the bulk of Iranian retail industry.
