= Filband =

Filband فيل بند
- Village
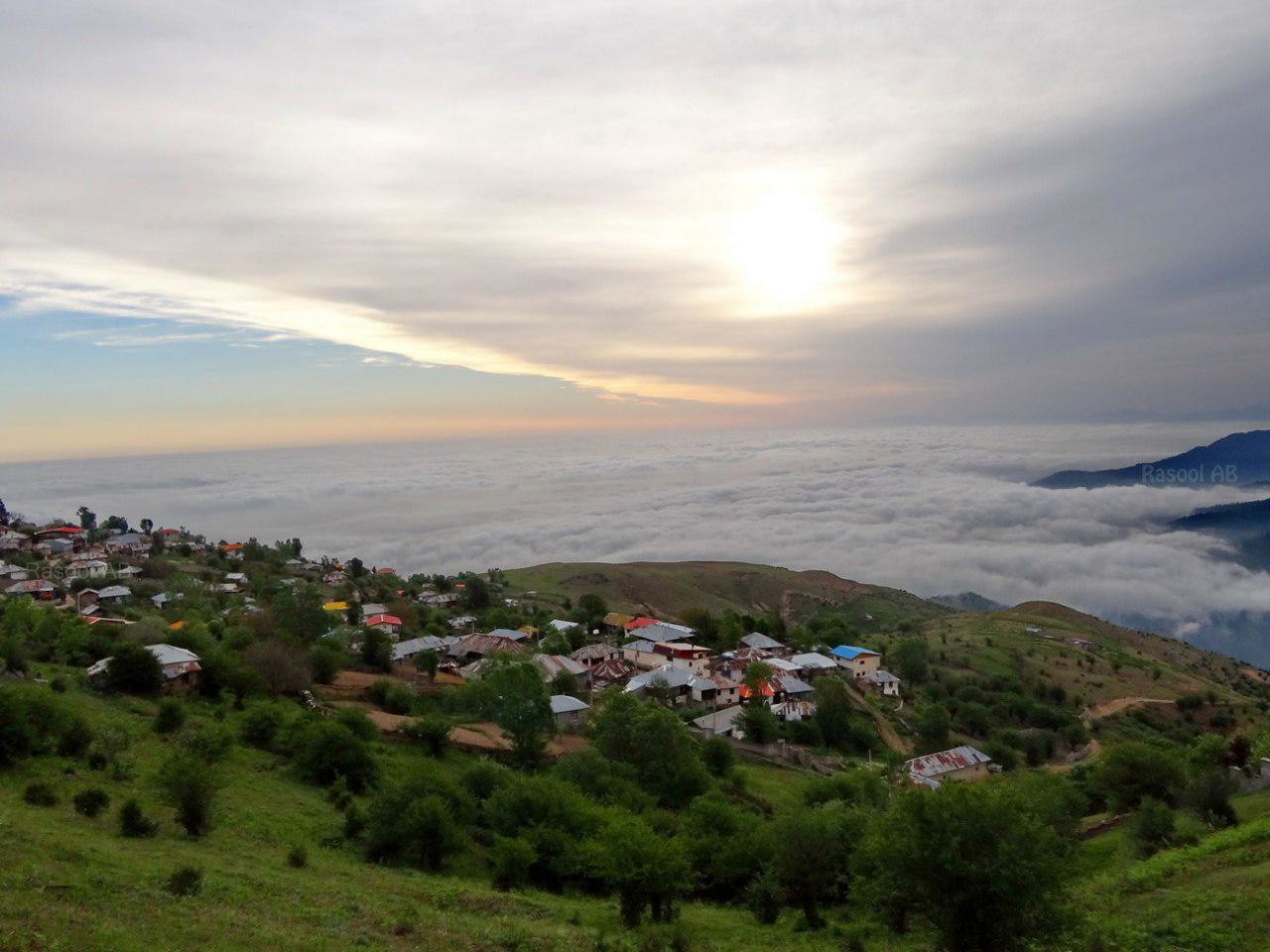
- Village view.

- Location within Iran
- Coordinates: 36°09′12″N 52°31′43″E
- Country: Iran
- Province: Mazandaran
- County: Babol County
- Bakhsh: Bandpey-ye Gharbi
- Rural District: Khvosh Rud

Population (2016)
  - Total: 148
- Time zone: UTC+3:30 (IRST)

Filband (Persian: فيل بند, also Romanized as Fīlband) is a village in Bandpey-ye Gharbi District of Babol County, Mazandaran Province, Iran. At the 2016 census, its population was 148 people, in 55 households.

This village is located at an altitude of about 2,300 metres above sea level. Filband on the eastern side of Mazandaran is known as the roof of the province.

In this village, winter begins very soon and ends late.

The combination of high mountains and dense forests which pass through a large amount of white clouds has turned the village into a popular tourist destination.

According to the Iran Front Page, tourist find the peaceful, quiet nature to be eye-opening.
