= Babol University of Medical Sciences =

University in Babol, Iran

Coordinates: 36.53118°N 52.67806°E

- Type: Public
- Established: 1985
- Chancellor: Hossein Ghorbani (MD)
- Faculty: 416
- Students: 4,700
- Location: Babol, Mazandaran Province, Iran
- Campus: Urban
- Website: en.mubabol.ac.ir

Babol University of Medical Sciences (MUBabol) (Persian: دانشگاه علوم پزشکی بابل, Daneshgah-e Olum-e Pezeshki-ye Babol) is a medical sciences university in the city of Babol, Mazandaran Province, Iran.

The university was founded in 1985, and the first group of students beginning their studies in 1986. The university operates seven hospitals.

== History ==
Babol University of Medical Sciences traces its origins to a school for laboratory technicians established in 1962. In 1983, as part of national efforts to expand higher education and medical training, the Ministry of Culture and Higher Education sent a medical advisory delegation to Mazandaran Province. The delegation approved the establishment of a medical sciences centre in the region. The institution was subsequently elevated to university status in 1985. Its first cohort of medical students was admitted in early 1986 through Iran's national university entrance examination, marking the beginning of its formal medical education activities. Over the following years, medical sciences schools were also established in Rasht, Sari, and Gorgan as medical education expanded across northern Iran. Following the establishment of the Ministry of Health and Medical Education and the transfer of medical education from the Ministry of Culture and Higher Education, the central administration of Mazandaran University of Medical Sciences was initially based in Babol. After the central administration was later transferred to Sari, Babol University of Medical Sciences became administratively independent in 1991. Following its independence, the university expanded its educational and clinical infrastructure and established additional schools, teaching hospitals, and research centers. New undergraduate and postgraduate programs were introduced across medical, dental, pharmaceutical, nursing, rehabilitation, public health, and related health sciences. The university also developed specialized clinical and research facilities to support medical education, patient care, and biomedical research in the region.

An early view of the main building of Babol University of Medical Sciences

A current view of the main building of Babol University of Medical Sciences

== Schools ==
- School of Medicine

School of Medicine

The School of Medicine provides education and training in clinical and basic medical sciences at undergraduate and postgraduate levels. Its programs include the M.D. degree, specialty and subspecialty residency training, fellowship programs, as well as M.Sc., MPH, and Ph.D. programs in the basic sciences. Clinical education is conducted through several affiliated teaching hospitals and medical centres, including Ayatollah Rouhani Hospital, Shahid Beheshti Hospital, Shahid Yahyanejad Hospital, Amirkola Children's Hospital, Shahid Rajaee Radiotherapy Center, and Fatemeh Al-Zahra Infertility and Reproductive Health Center. The school's basic science departments cover areas such as anatomy, physiology, pharmacology, clinical biochemistry, medical physics, immunology, genetics, microbiology, and medical biotechnology. Its clinical departments span major medical specialties, including internal medicine, surgery, pediatrics, obstetrics and gynecology, cardiology, neurology, psychiatry, radiology, pathology, ophthalmology, dermatology, orthopedics, urology, anesthesiology, infectious diseases, and radiation oncology.

- School of Dentistry

School of Dentistry

The School of Dentistry is located in the southern part of Babol, west of the main campus of Babol University of Medical Sciences. It began its academic activities in 1993 with the establishment of the general dentistry program, and its first cohort graduated in 1998. The school also offered associate-level dental nursing programs during several academic years and introduced a program in oral and dental health in 2007. Postgraduate specialty training began with periodontics in 2007, followed by programs in radiology, restorative dentistry, and endodontics in 2008. The school has subsequently expanded its postgraduate education to include the full range of recognized dental specialties.

- School of Pharmacy

School of Pharmacy

The School of Pharmacy provides education and training in pharmaceutical sciences, combining theoretical coursework with practical and clinical experience. Its programs prepare students for work in community pharmacy, hospital pharmacy, and the pharmaceutical industry. Research activities are supported through units including the Pharmaceutical Sciences Research Center, with work spanning different areas of pharmaceutical science. Clinical training is also carried out through the university's affiliated teaching hospitals, including Ayatollah Rouhani Hospital and Shahid Beheshti Hospital.

- School of Traditional Medicine

School of Traditional Medicine

The development of traditional medicine at Babol University of Medical Sciences began in 2008 with the establishment of a dedicated library, a medicinal plants garden, and the Secretariat of Traditional Medicine. Formal efforts to establish an academic department began in 2010, and groups in traditional medicine and the history of medicine were formed in 2011. The university subsequently collaborated with Tehran University of Medical Sciences in the field of traditional pharmacy. Approval in principle for the establishment of the School of Traditional Medicine was granted in 2012. The school later introduced Ph.D. training in traditional medicine and, from 2014, a master's program in the history of medical sciences.

- School of Rehabilitation

School of Rehabilitation

The development of rehabilitation education at Babol University of Medical Sciences began in 1991 with initial plans to establish a physiotherapy program. A bachelor's degree in physiotherapy was established in 2008, and the School of Rehabilitation was formally inaugurated in 2016. The school includes academic programs in physiotherapy, speech therapy, and audiology, supported by theoretical and practical teaching facilities. Its activities also include rehabilitation-related research and clinical training, with educational and therapeutic services provided through affiliated hospitals and clinics.

- School of Nursing and Midwifery

School of Nursing and Midwifery

Babol University of Medical Sciences has offered nursing and midwifery education since 1990. Until 2017, these programs were administered as departments within the School of Medicine, and in 2018 they were reorganized as an independent School of Nursing and Midwifery. The school provides undergraduate and postgraduate education in nursing and midwifery, including programs in neonatal intensive care and midwifery. Its curriculum combines theoretical coursework with practical training, including skills-laboratory instruction and clinical placements in affiliated hospitals.

- School of Public Health

School of Public Health

The School of Public Health is located on the southern side of the Babol University of Medical Sciences campus and shares facilities with the School of Allied Medical Sciences. Its establishment was approved by the Council for the Development of Medical Sciences Universities in December 2018, and the school formally began its academic activities in August 2019. It offers undergraduate programs in environmental health engineering and public health, as well as postgraduate education in environmental health engineering, ageing health, and biostatistics.

- School of Allied Medical Sciences

School of Allied Medical Sciences

The School of Allied Medical Sciences offers education and training across a range of allied health disciplines. Its academic activities include the development of postgraduate programs and the use of clinical and information skills centers to support practical training. The school is also involved in scientific publishing through its research journal and has introduced initiatives in educational and administrative innovation. These activities support both professional training and research within the allied health sciences.

- School of Nursing (Ramsar)

School of Nursing (Ramsar)

The Ramsar School of Nursing traces its origins to a paramedical institute that operated from 1971 to 1983. It was upgraded to a paramedical school in 1984 and began offering associate-level nursing education that year. Undergraduate nursing education was introduced in 1985. In 1993, the institution was elevated to the status of a School of Nursing under Babol University of Medical Sciences.

== Research centers ==
The Health Research Institute of Babol University of Medical Sciences was established in 2016. It coordinates a number of research centres across different biomedical and health-related fields. The research centres include:

- Cellular and Molecular Biology Research Center

The Cellular and Molecular Biology Research Center conducts research on the cellular and molecular mechanisms underlying prevalent diseases, including cancer, cardiovascular disease, diabetes, and inherited disorders such as thalassemia and cystic fibrosis. Its research areas include genomics and proteomics, stem-cell biology and cell therapy, mechanisms of drug action, and the biological effects of medicinal plants. The center also investigates pharmaceutical nanostructures through both in vitro and in vivo studies, with particular emphasis on diseases of regional and public-health importance.

- Non-Communicable Pediatric Disease Research Center

The Non-Communicable Pediatric Disease Research Center focuses on research related to common and clinically important conditions affecting infants and children. Its research areas include developmental disorders, urinary tract infections, neonatal jaundice, diabetes and other metabolic disorders, Kawasaki disease, thalassemia, and pediatric poisoning. The center also conducts studies on the prevention and treatment of asthma and allergic diseases, as well as child growth and developmental outcomes.

- Infertility and Health Reproductive Research Center

The Infertility and Reproductive Health Research Center conducts research on female and male infertility, with particular emphasis on endometriosis, polycystic ovary syndrome (PCOS), recurrent pregnancy loss, and poor ovarian response. Its activities include epidemiological, hormonal, genetic, molecular, laboratory, and imaging studies, as well as the development of clinical databases and biological sample banks for reproductive disorders. The center also investigates infertility treatments, environmental and nutritional factors affecting fertility, interactions between conventional and traditional medicines, and experimental approaches involving stem cells and pregnancy-related genes in sperm and oocytes.

- Infectious Diseases and Tropical Medicine Research Center

The Infectious Diseases and Tropical Medicine Research Center focuses on the epidemiology, prevention, and control of bacterial, fungal, parasitic, and viral infections. Its research includes antimicrobial resistance, molecular mechanisms of drug resistance, hospital-acquired infections, and the identification of bacterial strains associated with common infectious diseases. The center also investigates the prevalence of parasitic and fungal diseases, brucellosis, respiratory viral infections, and blood-borne viral infections including HIV, hepatitis B, hepatitis C, and Epstein–Barr virus.

- Dental Materials Research Center

The Dental Materials Research Center conducts multidisciplinary research across dental materials and clinical dentistry, including restorative dentistry, prosthodontics, orthodontics, endodontics, periodontics, pediatric dentistry, oral pathology, oral and maxillofacial surgery, and diagnostic imaging. Its research covers the physical, mechanical, and biological properties of dental biomaterials, restorative and prosthetic materials, implant-related materials, CAD/CAM technologies, ceramics, polymers, bonding systems, and emerging materials and techniques used in dental treatment. The center also investigates oral and maxillofacial diseases, dental imaging and CBCT applications, implant and periodontal therapies, temporomandibular disorders, dental trauma and tumors, and the use of medicinal plants and other approaches in the management of oral conditions.

- Social Determinants of Health Research Center

The Social Determinants of Health Research Center focuses on the social, behavioral, and structural factors that influence health and access to care. Its research areas include healthy lifestyles, mental health and its social consequences, vulnerable populations, health literacy, self-care, and community empowerment. The center also studies health equity, social inequalities, intersectoral collaboration, health governance, and the quality and experience of healthcare services, with an emphasis on community-based research.

- Mobility Impairment Research Center

The Mobility Impairment Research Center focuses on the prevention, diagnosis, treatment, and rehabilitation of movement disorders associated with neurological, neuromuscular, and musculoskeletal conditions. Its research includes neurodegenerative diseases, multiple sclerosis, epilepsy, pain, cognitive and behavioral disorders, aging-related mobility problems, biomechanics, occupational movement disorders, and the development of disease registries. The center also investigates neurotechnology, rehabilitation programs, speech-related motor disorders, benign positional vertigo, and the role of nutrition in movement and functional recovery.

- Cancer Research Center

The Cancer Research Center conducts clinical, epidemiological, molecular, and translational research across a range of cancers, including breast, gastric, colorectal, esophageal, thyroid, skin, head and neck, and genitourinary malignancies. Its research covers cancer prevention, diagnosis, treatment, rehabilitation, prognosis, radiotherapy, chemotherapy, surgical approaches, and the evaluation of treatment effectiveness and adverse effects. The center also investigates genetic, immunological, pathological, genomic, and proteomic aspects of cancer, alongside quality of life, supportive and palliative care, health economics, and the social and psychological needs of patients and caregivers.

- Oral Health Research Center

The Oral Health Research Center focuses on epidemiological and health-oriented research related to oral and craniofacial conditions. Its research includes diseases affecting the dentoalveolar and craniofacial skeletal systems, as well as the diagnosis and treatment of dental, periodontal, oral mucosal, and maxillofacial disorders. The center also supports studies aimed at improving oral health and clinical care across these areas.

== International journals ==
Babol University of Medical Sciences is affiliated with a number of academic journals in medical and health-related fields.

=== English-language journals ===
Caspian Journal of Dental Research Caspian Journal of Internal Medicine International Journal of Molecular and Cellular Medicine Current Research in Medical Sciences Caspian Journal of Pediatrics Caspian Journal of Reproductive Medicine Caspian Journal of Surgery

=== Persian-language journals ===
Journal of Babol University of Medical Sciences Medical Education Journal Caspian Journal of Scientometrics Islam And Health Journal Caspian Journal of Health and Aging

== Teaching hospitals ==
Babol University of Medical Sciences operates seven teaching hospitals that provide clinical services and support medical education and training. The affiliated hospitals include:

- Shahid Yahyanejad Hospital
- Shahid Beheshti Hospital
- Ayatollah Rouhani Hospital
- Amirkola Pediatric Hospital
- Shahid Rajaie Hospital
- 17 Shahrivar Hospital
- Fatemeh Alzahra Hospital

== Rankings ==
Babol University of Medical Sciences has appeared in several international university ranking systems.

Ranking	Subject	2023	2024	2025	2026	2027
ShanghaiRanking GRAS	Clinical Medicine	201–300	401–500	—	—	n/a
Times Higher Education	Overall	401–500	601–800	601–800	601–800	801-1000
Times Higher Education	Medical and Health	301-400	501-600	501-600	601-800	601-800
CWTS Leiden Ranking Open Edition	—	—	—	2070	n/a	n/a

== Campus gallery ==
Tree-lined walkway on the university campus

Spring blossoms on the university grounds

Flower garden beside a university building

Green space and water feature on the university campus

Garden pavilion on the university grounds

Red autumn foliage along a campus walkway

Autumn foliage across the university grounds

Aerial view of the main campus of Babol University of Medical Sciences in Babol, with the approximate campus boundary highlighted in yellow. The campus covers approximately 42 hectares

== See also ==
- Higher education in Iran
