= Mokarrameh Ghanbari =

Iranian female artist (1928–2005)

- مکرمه قنبری
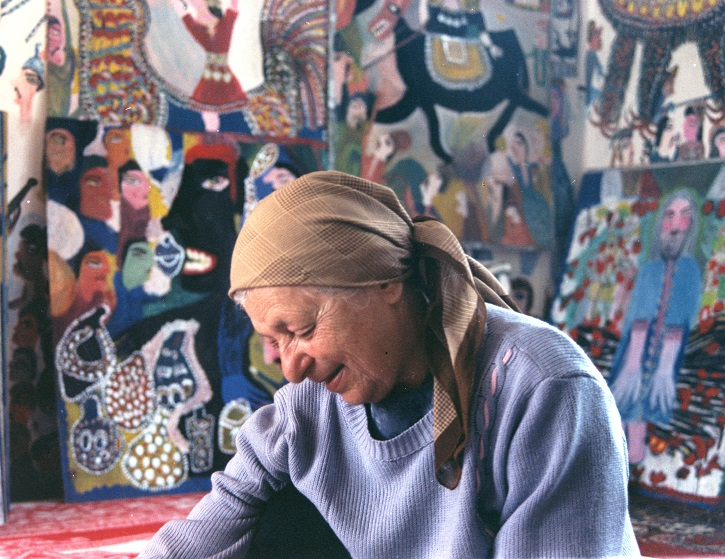
- Ghanbari (2001)
- Born: 1928; Darikhaneh village, Mazanderan Province, Imperial State of Iran
- Died: 24 October 2005 (aged 77)
- Style: Outsider art, Folk art
- Website: www.mokarramehmuseum.com

Mokarrameh Ghanbari (Persian: مکرمه قنبری; 1928 – 24 October 2005) was an Iranian self-taught painter who won several international art awards. She started painting at the age of 61 in 1991.

== Biography ==
Mokarrameh was born in 1928 in the Darikhaneh village in the northern Mazandaran Province of Iran. Despite her talent, she never received any formal training in painting.

== Work ==
She began painting at the age of 61, when she came across some artist's paintings which her son had left at her home. She continued her painting using bright, original colors inspired by the beautiful natural surroundings of her neighborhood, and within a few years her works were noticed by painters in Iran and overseas.

She held her first exhibition at the Seyhun Gallery in Tehran in 1995. The artist also participated in ten other exhibitions and was awarded the jury prize at the Roshd International Film Festival and another award at the Rural Artistic-Literary Festival. In 2001, she was awarded an honorary certificate at the Conference of the Foundation of Iranian Women's Studies in Stockholm, Sweden and was named the year's exemplary woman.

In addition, she was named the "Female Painter of 2001" by the Swedish National Museum.

== Death and legacy ==
She died on 24 October 2005, at the age of 77, and is buried in the courtyard of her house in Iran. Her house is decorated with paintings by Ghanbari and is a registered art museum by the Ministry of Cultural Heritage, Tourism and Handicrafts.

Iranian filmmaker Ebrahim Mokhtari released in 2002 a documentary film about the life and works of the artist entitled, Mokarrameh, Her Memories and Dreams.
