= 2015 World Beach Wrestling Championships =

International beach wrestling competition

The 2015 World Beach Wrestling Championships was held in Mangalia, Romania, from 13 to 15 June 2015.

== Medal table ==
Rank	Nation	Gold	Silver	Bronze	Total
1	Romania (ROM)	9	11	9	29
2	Iran (IRI)	7	1	1	9
3	Russia (RUS)	2	3	2	7
4	Greece (GRE)	1	2	3	6
5	Norway (NOR)	0	1	2	3
6	Moldova (MDA)	0	1	1	2
7	Kazakhstan (KAZ)	0	0	1	1
Totals (7 entries)		19	19	19	57

== Medal summary ==
Cadet Men Results:

60 kg

1. Khorasani REZA RAZIPOLIR (IRI) 2. Molnos NORBERT (ROU) 3. Nicolaev NURGUSTAAN (RUS) 4. Robert ILIE (ROU)

70 kg

1. Theodoros IOSIFIDIS (GRE) 2. Gennadios KARYPIDIS (GRE) 3. Kristian KOVACS (ROU) 4. GHEORGHE FLORIN (ROU)

+70 kg

1. Sebastien RAICEA (ROU) 2. Karimisarabi MEHRAB (IRI) 3. Male MARIUS (NOR) 4. Theodoros KIRIAKIDIS (GRE)

Team Standings: Romania (17), Greece (13) and Iran (12)

Cadet Women Results:

50 kg

1. Stefania PRICEPUTU (ROU) 2. Cristina PINTILIE (ROU) 3. Denisa FODOR (ROU) 4. Maria NIKOLAIDOU (GRE)

+50 kg

1. Larisa NITU (ROU) 2. Magnussen CESILIE (NOR) 3. Christina APMPAZI (GRE) 4. Esmerelda CATARGIU (ROU)

Team Standings: Romania (23), Norway (5), Greece (4)

Men's Junior Beach Wrestling

60 kg

1. Ali MOAHAMMADZADEHNAGHARCHI (IRI) 2. Anton ZAKHAROV (RUS) 3. Sergiu CONSTANTIN (ROU) 4. Madalin BULGAR (ROU)

70 kg

1. Donskoi DMITRII (RUS) 2. Liviu COSTACHE (ROU) 3. Rahmani Baghbanani SAMAN (IRI) 4. Sorin GOGU (ROU)

80 kg

1. Ahoopa ABOLFAZL (IRI) 2. Marius MARIN (ROU) 3. Ionut CARAS (ROU) 4. Pavlos KYRIAKIDIS (GRE)

+80 kg

1. Amir HOSSEIN MIRBABASHANI (IRI) 2. Razvan BITERE (ROU) 3. Vasile SEVASTIANU (MDA) 4. Constantin DANILA (ROU)

Team Standing: Iran (24), Romania (24) and Russia (12)

Women's Junior Beach Wrestling

50 kg

1. Georgiana BURDUF (ROU) 2. Ana Maria BUNDUC (ROU) 3. Mihaela BARBULESCU (ROU) 4. Eleni PAPAMICHAIL (GRE)

60 kg

1. Madalina CAIA (ROU) 2. Andrea PAUC (ROU) 3. Rita GUNN (NOR) 4. Thea MAGUSSEN (NOR)

+60 kg

1. Adelin DUDUIALA (ROU) 2. Elena SCARLATESCU (ROU) 3. Elena TOCU (ROU)

Team Standing: Romania (42), Norway (4), Greece (1)

Men's Senior Beach Wrestling

70 kg 1. Naderi MOHAMMAD (IRI) 2. Masharipov RUSTAM (RUS) 3. Gabirel BADEA (ROU) 3. Apostolos TASKOUDIS (GRE)

80 kg 1. Stepanov STANISLAV (RUS) 2. Kyrillos BINENMPAOUM (GRE) 3. Denis SIVTCEV (RUS) 3. Mehdizadehchari MILAD (IRI)

90 kg 1. Mohammad SEYYED (IRI) 2. Bugulov MIURGUN (RUS) 3. Dorin PIRVAN (ROU) 3. Andrei FRANZ (ROU)

+90 kg 1. Sadeghzadehnoukolaei JABER (IRI) 2. Egor OLAR (MDA) 3. Aris THEODOROUDIS (GRE) 3. Marian TODOROV (BUL)

IRAN (24) RUSSIA (23) ROMANIA (22)

Women's Senior Beach Wrestling

60 kg 1. Madalina LINGURARU ROU 2. Mihaela OBREGIA ROU 3. Yuliya KHAMELIS KAZ 4. Juel-Bugge RIKKE (NOR)

70 kg 1. Beatrice OANCEA (ROU) 2. Roxana ANDREI (ROU) 3. Laura GAVRILUC (ROU)

+70 kg 1. Diana FRANT (ROU) 2. Ana Maria STOIAN (ROU) 3. Aiktepnh Eiphnh PITSIAVA (GRE) 4. Dahle Netskar CHATHRINE (NOR)

Romania (39), Kazakhstan (3), Greece (3)
