= Hyper Star =

Iran Hyperstar
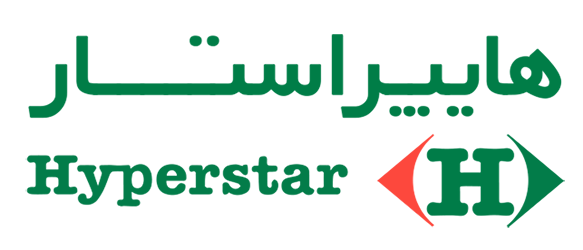
- Company type: Public company
- Industry: Retail
- Founded: 2009; 17 years ago
- Founder: Majid Al Futtaim and Carrefour
- Headquarters: Tehran, Iran
- Number of locations: 40: Tehran, Isfahan, Shiraz, Karaj, Yazd, Sirjan, Bandar Abbas
- Area served: Iran
- Products: Cash & Carry/warehouse club, convenience/forecourt store, discount store, hypermarket/supercenter/superstore and supermarket
- Website: www.hyperstariran.com

Iran Hyper Star is an Iranian subsidiary of French multinational retailer Carrefour in Iran.

== History ==
Iran HyperStar was founded by the collaboration of Majid Al Futtaim and Carrefour.

== Branches ==
Iran Hyperstar currently has 40 branches in Tehran, Shiraz, Isfahan, Yazd, Karaj, Mashhad, Bandar Abbas Sirjan and Ghazvin.
