= Simin Aqa-Razi =

Iranian musician (1938-2010)

- Born: 15 December 1938; Tehran
- Died: 11 January 2010 (aged 71)
- Occupations: Musician and Qanun player
- Years active: 1958-2000

Simin Aqa-Razi (Persian: سیمین آقارضی; 15 December 1938 – 11 January 2010) was an Iranian musician and qanun player. She learned to play the qanun from Mehdi Meftah. She collaborated on many works by prominent Iranian singers such as Mohammad-Reza Shajarian, Homeyra, Delkash, Hayedeh, Iraj, Sima Bina, Alireza Eftekhari, and Golpa.

== Life ==
She was born in Tehran in December 1938 and after completing her primary education entered the National Conservatory of Music. Abolhassan Saba said of her that she would become one of the great artists of Iranian music. Aqa-Razi was skilled in several instruments: she learned violin from Abolhassan Saba, piano from Javad Maroufi, qanun from Mehdi Meftah, singing from Gholam-Hossein Banan, and tombak from Hossein Tehrani. She was also familiar with playing the rubab, barbat and kamancheh.

== Works ==
Simin Aqa-Razi has collaborated with many major orchestras such as the Tehran Symphony Orchestra conducted by Ruhollah Khaleqi and performed alongside masters such as Parviz Yahaghi, Ali Tajvidi, Habibollah Badiee, Homayoun Khorram, Hossein Tehrani, and Yousef Yousefzadeh. For a time, she taught at the Association for the Support of the Blind where many students benefited from her classes.

In the late 1960s, she was hired as a soloist of the qanun on the radio and took part in major ensembles such as the Golha and the National Instrument Orchestra. Her solo recordings include the album Qanun-e Simin accompanied by tombak player Abtin Ajlali, which has been reprinted for many years.

== Death ==
She died on 11 January 2010, from illness at the age of 71 and was buried in the artists' plot of Behesht-e Zahra.
