= List of Mazandaranis =

== Arts ==
=== Literature ===
- Muhammad ibn Jarir al-Tabari (838-923), was a Persian world historian and theologian (the most famous and widely influential person called al-Tabari).
- Ibn Isfandiyar, historian, author of a history of Tabaristan (Tarikh-i Tabaristan).
- Mírzá Asadu’llah Fádil Mázandarání (1880–1957), Iranian Bahá'í scholar.
- Musa ibn Khalil Mazandarani, 19th century Persian scribe and scholar.
- Parviz Natel-Khanlari

==== Poetry ====
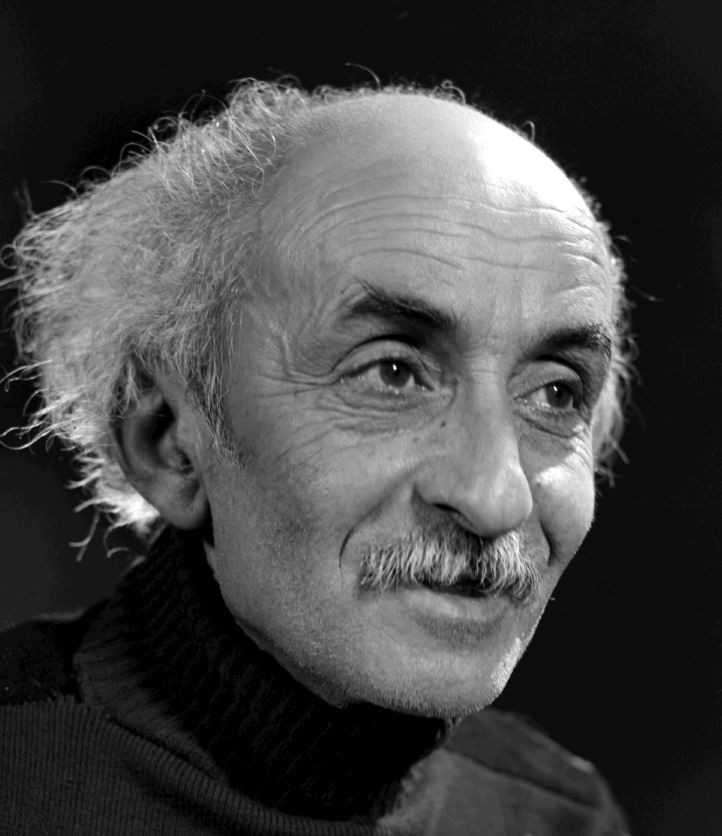
Nima Youshij

- Nima Youshij
- Mohammad Zohari
- Amir Pazevari
- Mina Assadi
- Seyed Karim Amiri Firuzkuhi
- Mohsen Emadi

=== Music ===
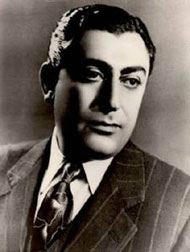
Gholam Hossein Banan

- Gholam Hossein Banan
- Abdolhossein Mokhtabad
- Delkash
- Bijan Mortazavi
- Afshin
- Benyamin Bahadori
- Farhang Sharif
- Parisa
- Simin Ghanem
- Majid Akhshabi
- Farya Faraji

=== Architecture ===
- Omar Tiberiades (Abû Hafs 'Umar ibn al-Farrukhân al-Tabarî Amoli) (d.c.815), Persian astrologer and architect.

=== Cinema ===
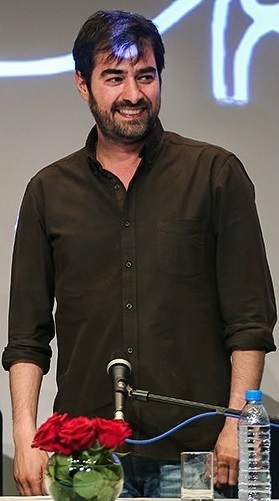
Shahab Hosseini

- Shahab Hosseini
- Parinaz Izadyar
- Roya Nonahali
- Khosrow Sinai
- Davoud Rashidi
- Maryam Kavyani
- Kambiz Dirbaz
- Ladan Mostofi
- Mostafa Zamani
- Mohammad Ali Sadjadi
- Anahita Hemmati
- Irene Zazians
- Reza Allamehzadeh
- Abbas Amiri Moghaddam
- Saba Kamali
- Ardalan Shoja Kaveh

=== Portrait artists ===
- Mokarrameh Ghanbari

=== Scholars ===
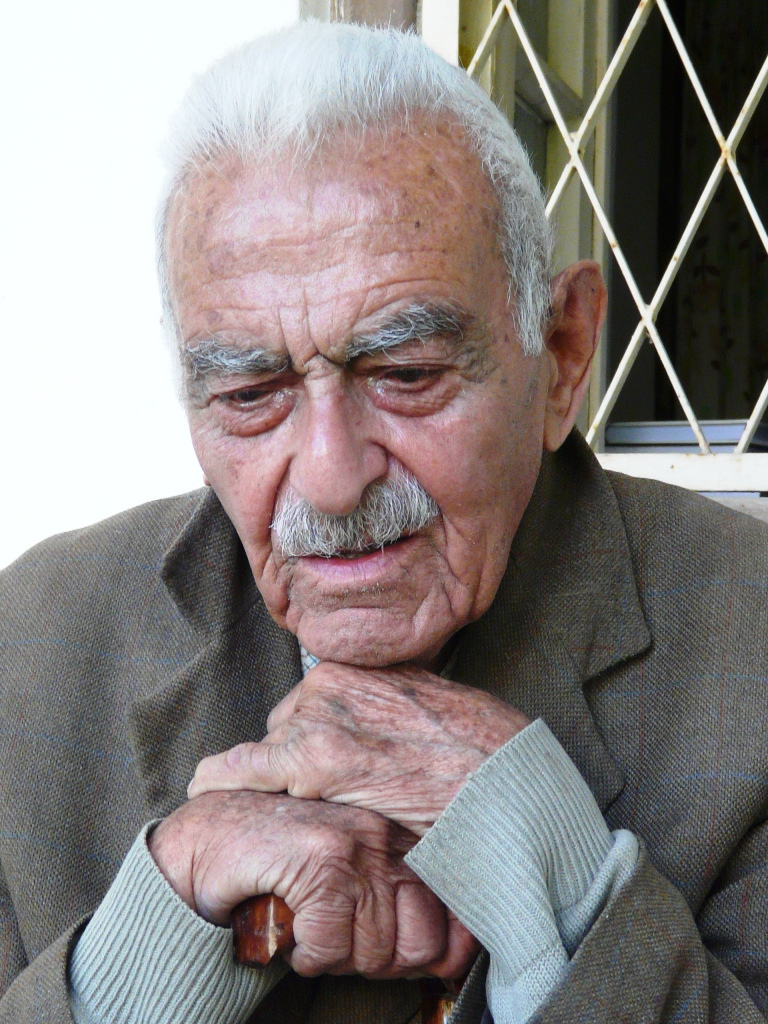
Manochehr Sotoudeh

- Manouchehr Sotodeh
- Mohammad Taqi Danesh Pajouh
- Ahmad Ghahreman

== History ==
- Arash, mythical hero
- Maziar, king of the region from 825 - 839
- Abu Makhlad Abdallah, statesman

== Sciences ==
=== Medicine, Biology and Chemistry ===
- Ali ibn Sahl Rabban al-Tabari His stature, however, was eclipsed by his more famous pupil, Muhammad ibn Zakarīya Rāzi.
- Abul Hasan al-Tabari, a 10th-century Iranian physician.

=== Social sciences ===
- Abu'l Tayyeb Tabari was a jurisconsult, judge (qāżī), and professor of legal sciences; he was regarded by his contemporaries as one of the leading Shafeʿites of 5th/11th century Baghdad.

== New Sciences ==
- Ali Yachkaschi
- Moslem Bahadori
- Iraj Malekpour
- Pooran Farrokhzad
- Shahrokh Meskoob

== Philosophy ==
- Fakhr al-Din al-Razi Theologian and philosopher.
- Ibn Hindu

== Physicians and astrologers ==
- Muhammad ibn Mahmud Amuli
- Abū Sahl al-Qūhī
- Al-Nagawri
- Sahl ibn Bishr
- Al-Nagawri
- Tunakabuni
- Al-Natili

== Athletics ==
=== Wrestling ===
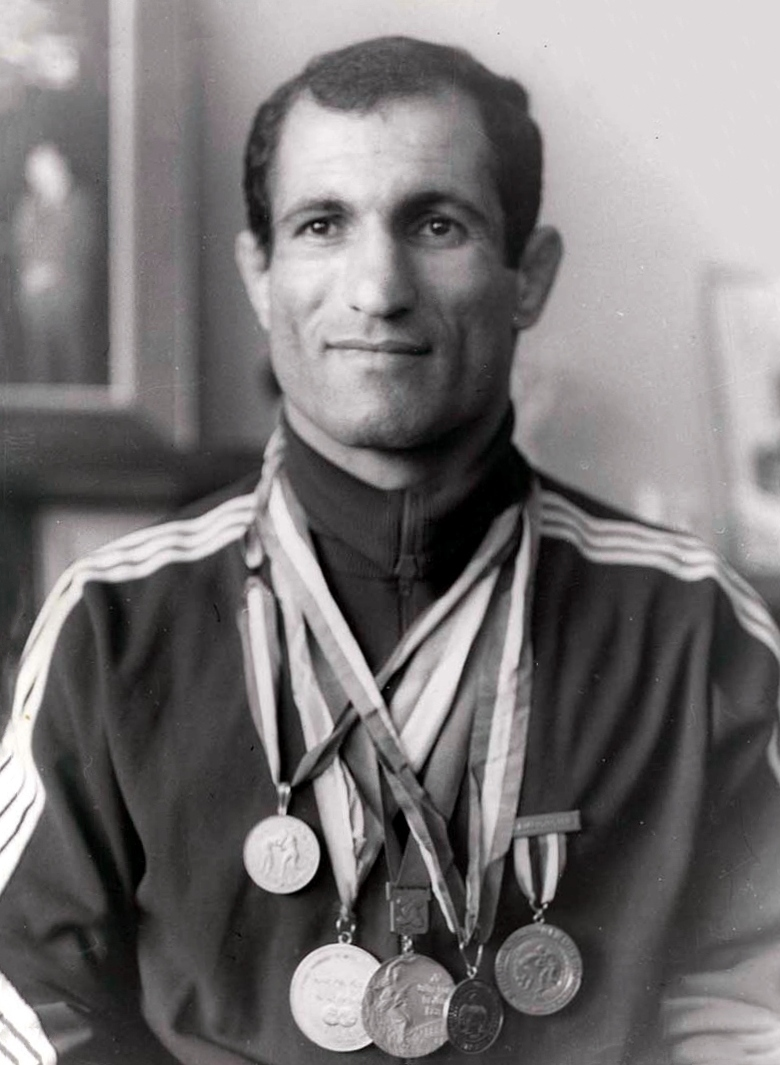
Abdollah Movahed

- Abdollah Movahed
- Imam-Ali Habibi
- Ghasem Rezaei
- Hassan Rangraz
- Reza Yazdani
- Hassan Yazdani
- Reza Soukhteh-Saraei
- Majid Torkan
- Askari Mohammadian
- Abbas Hajkenari
- Mehdi Taghavi
- Kamran Ghasempour

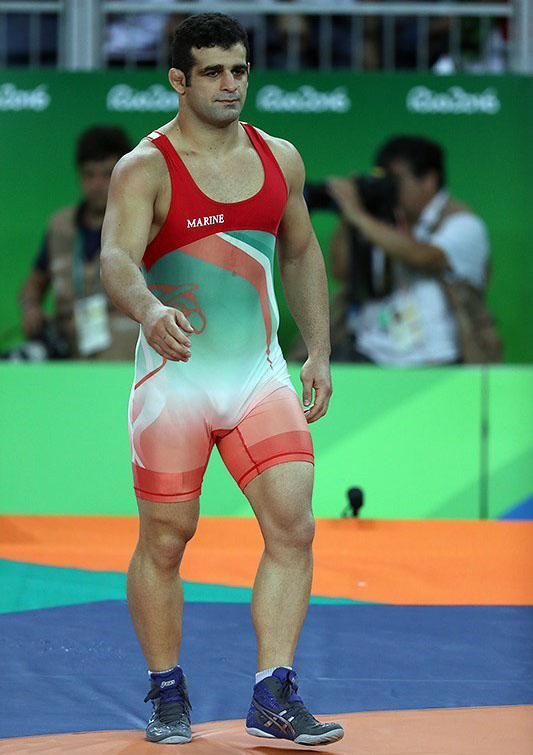
Ghasem Rezaei

- Komeil Ghasemi
- Morad Mohammadi
- Ahmad Mohammadi
- Mehdi Hajizadeh
- Masoud Esmaeilpour
- Ezzatollah Akbari
- Ali Asghar Bazri
- Behnam Ehsanpour

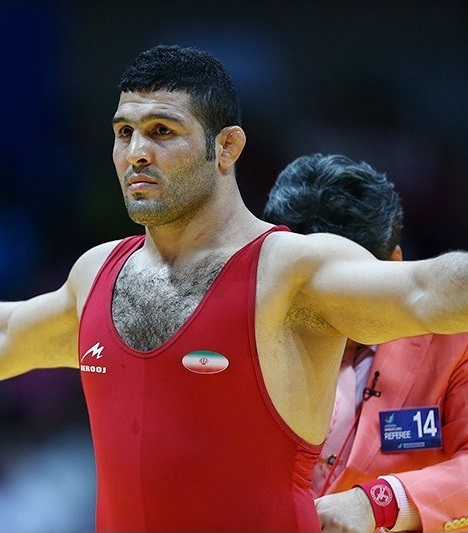
Reza Yazdani

- Bashir Babajanzadeh
- Reza Simkhah

=== Sports (Other) ===
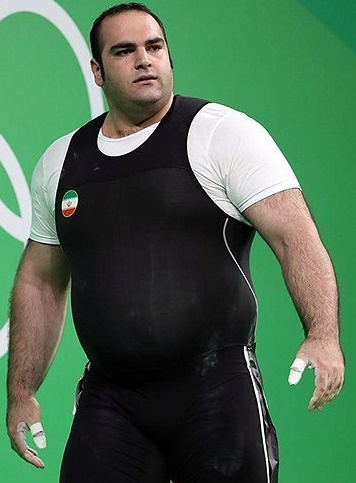
Behdad Salimi

- Alireza Firouzja
- Behdad Salimi
- Mohammad Reza Khalatbari
- Farhad Majidi
- Mehrdad Oladi
- Mohsen Bengar
- Rahman Ahmadi
- Hossein Tavakkoli
- Hanif Omranzadeh
- Hadi Norouzi
- Adel Gholami
- Mojtaba Mirzajanpour
- Sheys Rezaei
- Morteza Pouraliganji
- Mojtaba Abedini
- Sohrab Entezari
- Farshid Talebi
- Mousa Nabipour
- Shahab Gordan
- Noshad Alamiyan
- Sousan Hajipour
- Mahmoud Fekri
- Ramin Rezaeian
- Bahador Molaei

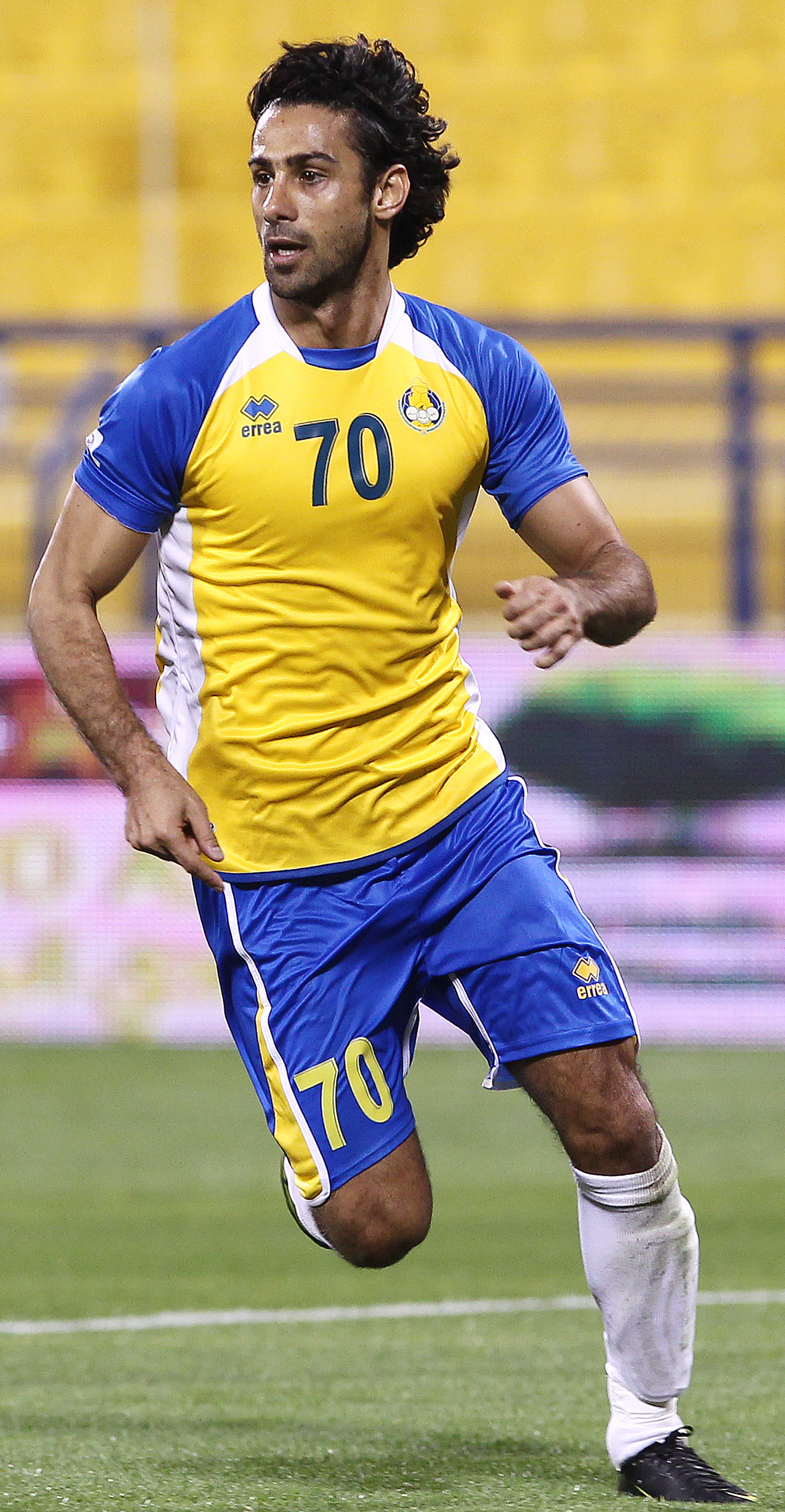
Farhad Majidi

- Maysam Baou
- Omid Ebrahimi
- Farzan Ashourzadeh
- Shoja' Khalilzadeh
- Omid Alishah
- Hamed Kavianpour
- Kianoush Rahmati
- Ebrahim Taghipour
- Mohsen Yousefi
- Javad Asghari Moghaddam
- Manouchehr Boroumand
- Jasem Delavari
- Peiman Hosseini

== Royalty ==
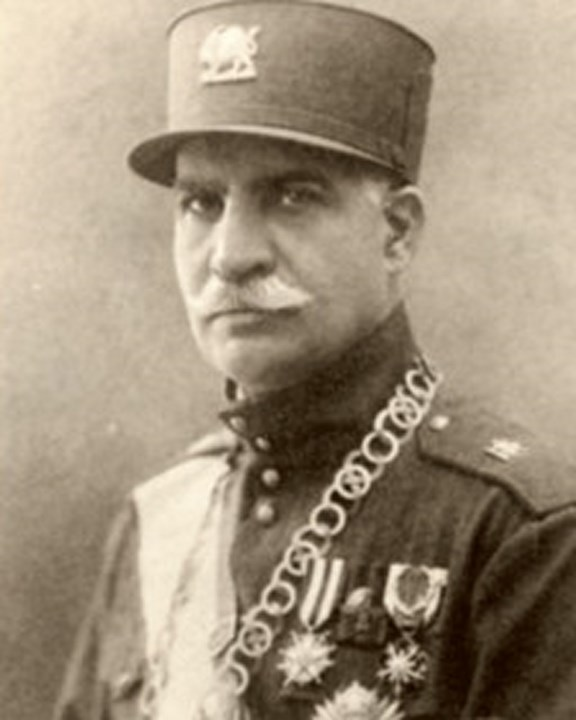
Reza Shah

- Maryam Khanom
- Reza Shah Pahlavi
- Mohammad Reza Pahlavi
- Dowlatshah
- Khayr al-Nisa Begum
- Khurshid of Tabaristan

== Military ==
- Ali Akbar Shiroodi
- Abbas Mirza
- Ahmad Keshvari
- Al-Mu'ayyad Ahmad
- Sardar Rafie Yanehsari
- Mohammad Rouyanian
- Iskandar-i Shaykhi

== Politics ==
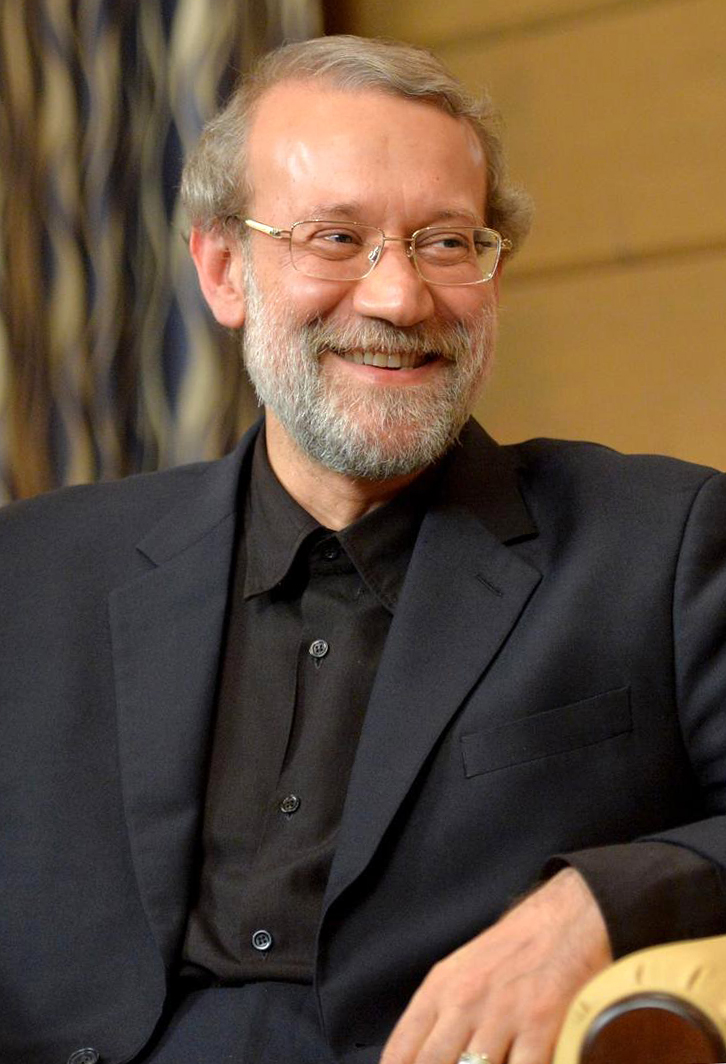
Ali Larijani

- Ali Larijani
- Mohammad Vali Khan Tonekaboni
- Manuchehr Mottaki
- Ehsan Tabari
- Hossein Ghods-Nakhai
- Noureddin Kianouri
- Ali-Akbar Davar
- Esfandiar Rahim Mashaei
- Hamid Reza Chitgar
- Sadeq Larijani
- Mohammad-Javad Larijani
- Bagher Larijani
- Ali Akbar Nategh-Nouri
- Mirza Aqa Khan Nuri
- Ahmad Tavakoli
- Davoud Hermidas-Bavand
- Sam Dastyari
- Ali Kordan
- Elaheh Koulaei

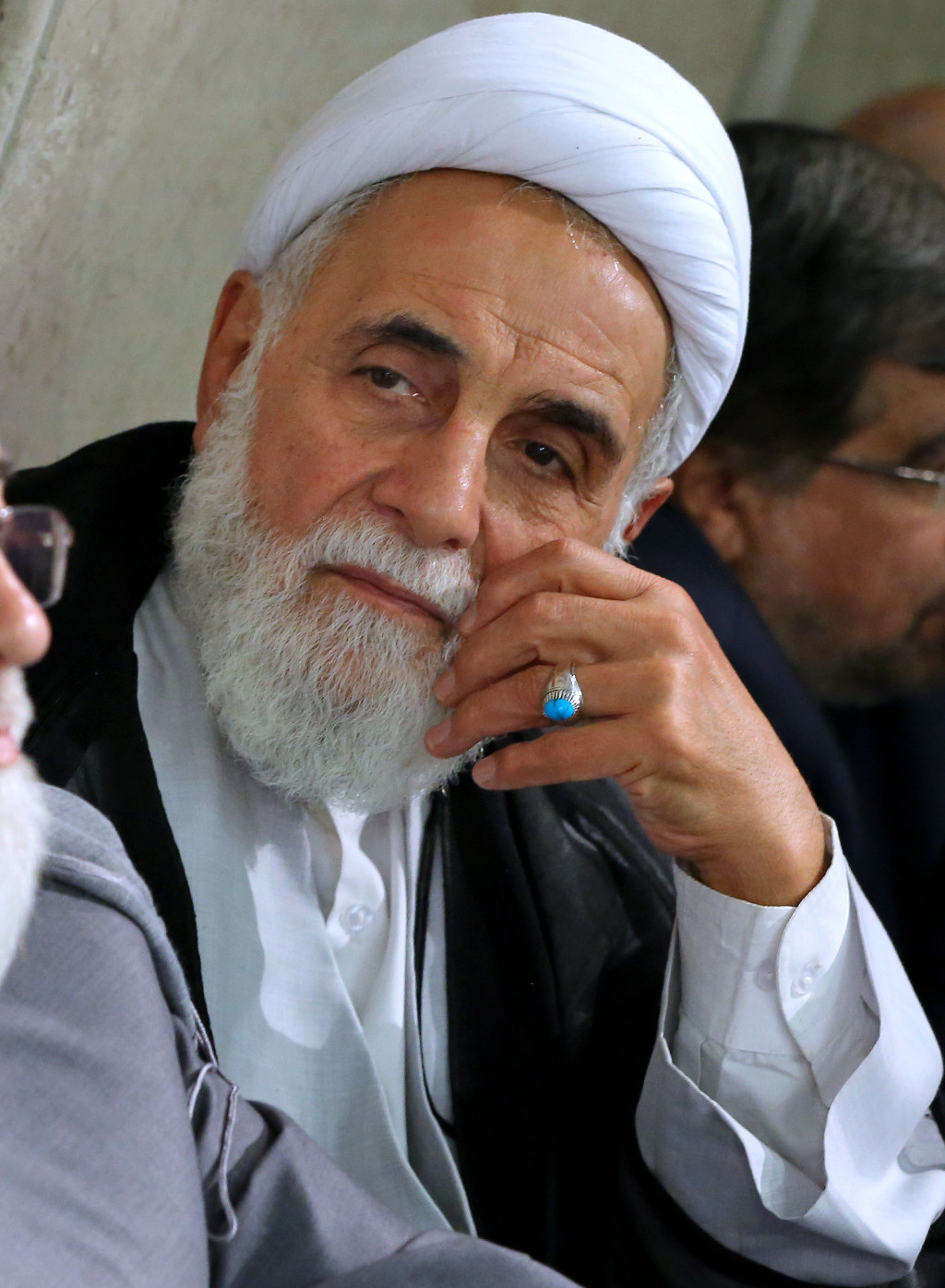
Ali Akbar Nategh Nouri

- Abdul Karim Hashemi Nejad
- Reza Sheykholeslam
- Shamseddin Hosseini
- Hassan Ghashghavi
- Mirza Hassan Khan Esfandiary

=== Christianity ===
- Hossein Fallah Noshirvani
- Shaban Dibaj

=== Judaism ===
- Daniel al-Kumisi

=== Baha'i Faith ===
- Baha'u'llah - The founder of the Baha'i Faith who was born and brought up in Nur, Mazandaran

=== Bab ===
- Quddús

== Islamic scholars ==
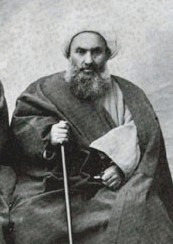
Sheikh Fazollah Nouri

- Abdollah Javadi-Amoli
- Mirza Hashem Amoli
- Abd al-Qahir al-Jurjani
- Muhammad Taqi Amoli
- Haydar Amuli
- Ibn Furak
- Ali Asghar Mazandarani
- Mirza Husain Noori Tabarsi
- Shaykh Tabarsi
- Yasubedin Rastegar Jooybari
- Abolhassan Shamsabadi
