= Homeyra =

Homeyra حميرا
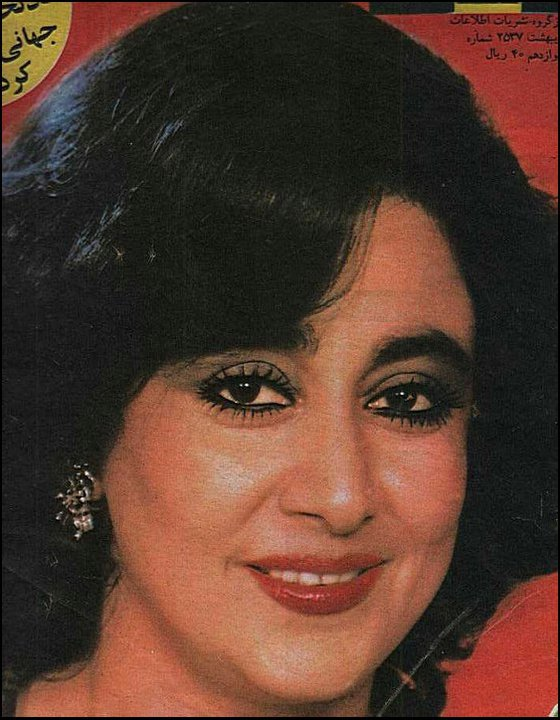

Background information
- Also known as: Homeyra, Homayra, Homeira
- Born: Parvaneh Amir-Afshari (Persian: پروانه اميرافشاری); March 17, 1945 (age 81); Tehran, Imperial State of Iran
- Genres: Persian traditional music, Jazz Fusion, Pop
- Occupation: Singer
- Instrument: Vocal
- Years active: 1965–present
- Labels: Taraneh Records, Caltex Records, Pars Video, Avang Records

Parvaneh Amir-Afshari (Persian: پروانه اميرافشاری; born March 17, 1945), better known by her stage name Homeyra (حميرا), is an Iranian singer. She is a veteran celebrity of golden age for Iranian music. According to her teacher, Ali Tajvidi, her voice is from alto to soprano. Homeyra, with more than half a century of artistic activity, has a legendary popularity among the Iranian people.

== Early life ==
Parvaneh Amir-Afshari was born on March 17, 1945, to an aristocratic Iranian family in Tehran, Iran. Her family is from Zanjan.

From Homeyra's childhood, their house, in honor of influential people in the government, witnessed large ceremonies with the presence of famous artists of the time, such as Rouhangiz, Gholam-Hossein Banan, Moluk Zarrabi and many others, which was the initial motivation of the daughter of the family to sing.

Due to her father's opposition to her daughter’s singing, she began her artistic career under the pseudonym Homeyra. But his father recognizes his daughter's voice, and since he considered his daughter's singing would discredit his family, he bought all of her vinyl discs in Tehran bazaar and stored them at home; and this is the reason why Homeira's voice on vinyl discs were scarce at that time.

After a year, during a trip to Europe of Homeyra's father, she, who had the support of her mother, continues her artistic work.

Homeyra was rejected from her home and family before the revolution, and after the revolution she was rejected from her larger home and family, which was her homeland of Iran and her compatriots. These two tragic events had a profound effect on Homeyra.

== Career ==
"Sabram Ata Kon" on Segah Dastgah was Homeyra's first song which was written by Ali Tajvidi and a lyrics by Bijan Taraghi that was broadcast from Radio Tehran in the fall of 1965, It was welcomed by Iranian music experts and the public, which has been recorded in the book of enduring songs. It was welcomed by Iranian music experts and the public.

The song "Pashimanam" other work that Homeyra has collaborated with Ali Tajvidi. "Pashimanam" caused a great change in Iranian traditional music due to its beautiful modulation, which changes its position from Homayoun to Sahagah and returns.

Homeyra's marriage to a composer and master violinist, Parviz Yahaghi created other lasting works in Iranian music.

Homeyra performed successful songs on the prestigious program "Golhâye Rangârang" (Persian: گلهای رنگارنگ "Colorful Flowers") which was broadcast on Radio Iran before the revolution, which helped to establish her artistic credibility.

After parting ways with Parviz Yahaghi, Homeira continued her artistic activity with other well-known artists, during which she added Fusion music and Pop music to her artistic career.

Homa Mirafshar, who is a relative of Homeyra, is one of the songwriters who has had the most collaboration with Homeyra. Babak Radmanesh is also one of the composers who has collaborated a lot with Homeyra after the Iranian revolution.

According to her teacher Ali Tajvidi, her voice is in the Alto range but she also has the ability to sing soprano.

According to experts, Homeyra's voice is powerful, emotional and beautiful. Homeyra was able to establish a new style (Homeraism) in Iranian traditional music and classical music of the 1940s by presenting a work called "Sabram Ata Kon" and give a special freshness to Iranian traditional music. After the Iranian Revolution, Homeyra was nicknamed the "Credit of Iranian Music" due to her artistic status.

== Personal life ==
As a teenager, Homeyra married a German-educated Iranian businessman whose family encouraged her to sing professionally. Homeyra's second marriage was to an Iranian musician, Parviz Yahaghi. Homeyra has introduced Parviz Yahaghi as her first and last love. After six years, for personal reasons, their life together ended. During this period, lasting works were made with the voice of Homeyra and the composition of Parviz Yahaghi and the lyrics of Bijan Taraghi who was a family friend of Parviz Yahaghi and Homeyra.

Homeyra was summoned to the courts of the Islamic Revolution after the revolution and, according to her, was reprimanded and harassed. Her third husband, a tie merchant, became virtually unemployed after the revolution. Homeyra remained in Iran until the end of 1982. She left Iran for Afghanistan with her two-year-old daughter, Yasaman, and went to Pakistan; from there she emigrated to Spain and then to Costa Rica in Central America. She suffered from severe depression in Costa Rica and was treated by a psychiatrist for a year. Her husband, meanwhile, immigrated directly to the United States, regardless of his wife and child. Homeyra then immigrated to California and resumed her artwork with the support of Ahmad Massoud, who worked in the field of music outside of Iran. Homeyra loves her homeland, Iran, and has sung many songs for Iran. She has said many times that she never wanted to leave Iran. After the Islamic revolution in Iran, and because of the problems and hardships that it created for her, Homeyra was forced to leave Iran against her will. For a medical condition, she underwent heart and brain surgery in the United States that miraculously recovered her health. Homeyra is committed to God and her personal beliefs, and her interest in mystical issues is reflected in her speech, songs, and lifestyle. She currently lives in Los Angeles. Homeyra has two children, Hengameh and Yasaman, and has a granddaughter, Ariana, from her younger daughter, Yasaman.According to Ali Tajvidi, Homeyra, in addition to her beautiful voice, has a beautiful and emotional personality that has influenced her voice. Homeyra rarely appears in public due to her special beliefs and spirit.

Homeyra is preparing a book of memories from her personal and artistic life and hopes to find an independent publisher to publish it.

Homeyra, with more than half a century of artistic activity, remains one of the few prominent stars of Iranian music.

== Other people's views ==
Gholam-Hossein Banan described Homeyra's voice as heavenly and magical, and believed that a voice like Homeyra's voice would not appear for another century.

Ali Tajvidi has described Homeyra's voice as rare, which is in the alto range and has soprano potential in the full range.

Parviz Yahaghi: Homeyra's voice can only be compared to Umm Kulthum's voice in her youth.

Jahanbakhsh Pazouki: Homeyra is a single star in the sky of Iranian art whose light has reached all artists.

Mohammad Heydari: Homeyra and Golpa created a revolution in Iranian traditional music.

Akbar Golpayegani: Homeyra is sun of the Iranian music sky.

Hassan Shamaizadeh: Homeyra's voice is beyond the level of the Middle East, and her vibrations voice are unparalleled.

== Discography ==
- Hamzabonam Bash (1976, March 21)
- Montazer Berah (1985)
- Ghanari (2004, November 20)
- Mahtab-E-Eshgh (1992)
- Golbarg (1993, June 14)
- Bahar Bahare (1993, June 17)
- Entezar (1993, June 17)
- Darvishan (1993)
- Bahar-E-Eshgh (1994, May 24)
- Darya Kenar (1995, December 31)
- Vaghti ke Eshgh Miad (1995, December 31)
- Khab o Khiyal (1995)
- Sharm Va Shekayat (1996)
- Hedieh (1997)
- Gozashteh (2008, November 12)
- Sarnevesht
- Montazer Bash
- Eshgh-O-Erfan
- Bahar-E-Zendeghi
- Ba Delam Mehraban Sho (1987)

=== Compilations ===
- Golhayeh Rangarang
- 40 Golden Hits of Homeyra (10 July 2008)
- Homayra, Vol. 1 (2009)
- Homayra, Vol. 3 (2009)
- Best of Homeyra (2009)
