= Elaheh =

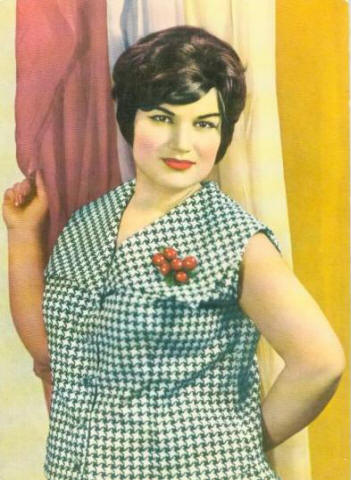
- Born: Bahar Gholamhosseini; 22 April 1934; Tehran, Iran
- Died: 15 August 2007 (aged 73); Tehran, Iran
- Occupation: Singer
- Spouse(s): Kheirollah Yeganeh (m. 1954–1959) Homayoun Yazdanfar (m. 1965)
- Children: 2

Bahar Gholamhosseini (Persian: بهار غلامحسینی, romanized: Bahar Gholamhosseini; April 22, 1934 – August 15, 2007), known professionally as Elaheh (Persian: الهه, romanized: Elaheh), was an Iranian singer of Persian classical, traditional and pop music. She worked with Parviz Yahaghi, Viguen and Homayun Khorram. She was one of the main singers of "Golha" program.

== Career ==
She studied singing with Abdollah Davami, an Iranian Radif maestro and Gholam-Hosein Banan, an Iranian classical singer. At 27, she was recognized by Davoud Pirnia, the founder of Golha radio program. She has more than 100 recordings in that program.

Among her performances were "Rosvaa-ye Zamaaneh" and "Az Khoon-e Javavane Vatan".
