= Mazanderani people =

Iranic people from Mazandaran, Iran

Mazanderanis
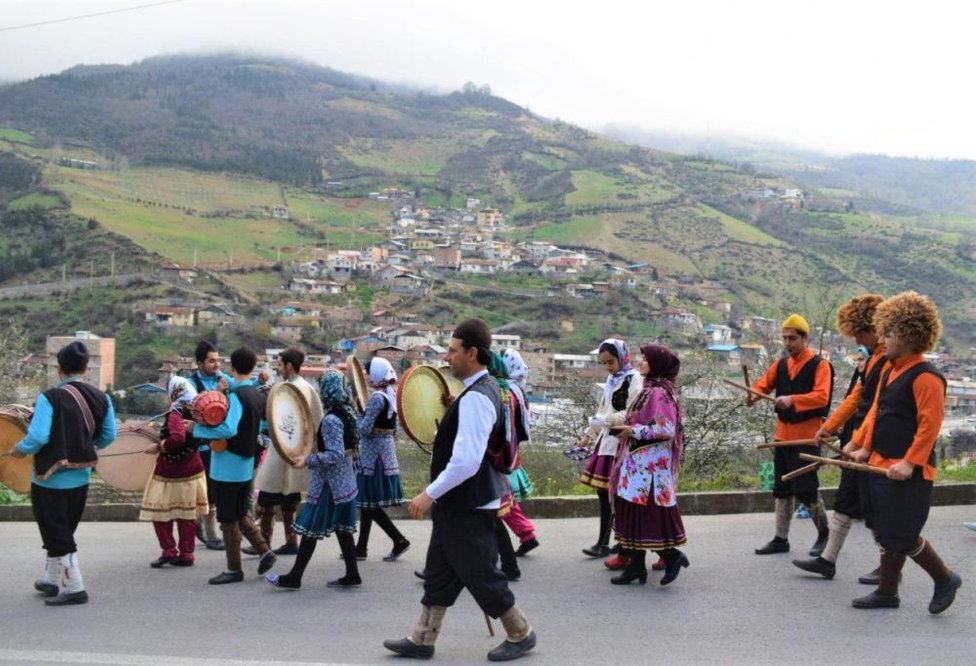
- Mazandarani men and women in traditional clothing at Nowruz

Total population
- 4.8 million (2023)

Regions with significant populations
- Province of Mazandaran and parts of the provinces of Alborz, Golestan, Tehran and Semnan in Iran

Languages
- Mazandarani

Religion
- Primarily: Shia Islam (Twelver)

Related ethnic groups
- Gilaks, other Iranian peoples

The Mazanderanis, (Note: Mazanderani: مازرونی مردمون; also known as the Tabari people or Tabarestani people (Mazanderani: توری مردمون or تبری مردمون)) or Mazanis, are an Iranian ethnic group who speak the Mazanderani language. They are an indigenous people of the Mazandaran province on the shores of the Caspian Sea. They live along the southern shores of the Caspian Sea and are part of the region historically known as Tabaristan. The Alborz Mountains mark the southern boundary of the area settled by the Mazanderani people.

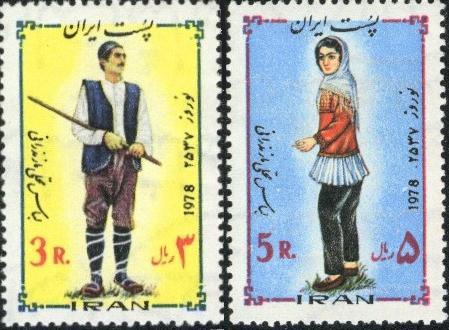
Traditional clothing of the Mazanderani people depicted on two Iranian stamps (1978)

== People ==
The population of Mazanderanis was 4,480,000 in 2019. As per a 2006 estimate, Mazandaranis numbered between 3 and 4 million.

Mazanderani people are also known as the Tabari people, and traditionally call the Mazanderani language as Tabari. Their region was called Tapuria or Tapurestan, Land of Tapuris.

Most Mazanderanis live on the southeastern coast of Caspian Sea. Their traditional professions are farming and fishing. Mazandaranis are closely related to the neighboring Gilaki people as well as South Caucasian peoples (e.g. Georgians, Armenians).

== History ==
The origin of the Mazanderanis goes back to Tapuri people and Amardi people. The Mazandaran region has experienced a long reign of independent and semi-independent rulers in the centuries after the Arab invasion lasting until 1596, when Shah Abbas I incorporated Mazandaran into the Safavid Empire.

== Language ==
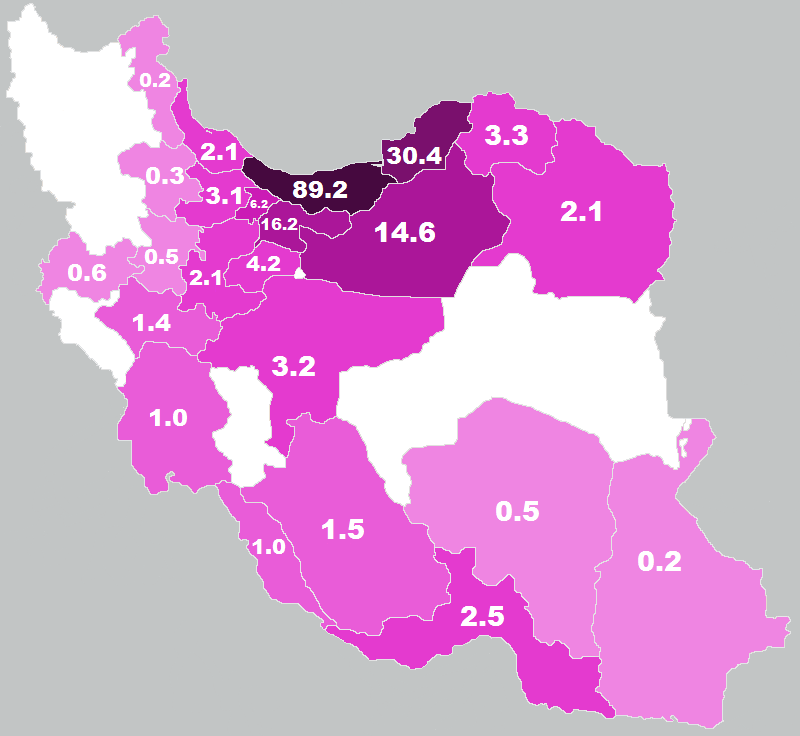
Percentage of Mazanderanis in Iran (2010)

The Mazanderani language is a Northwestern Iranian language spoken by the Mazanderani people; however, most Mazandaranis are also fluent in Persian. The Gilaki and Mazanderani languages (but not other Iranian languages) share certain typological features with Caucasian languages.

Mazanderani is closely related to Gilaki and the two languages have similar vocabularies. They preserve more of the noun declension system characteristic of older Iranian languages than Persian does. With the growth of education and the media, the distinction between Mazanderani and other Iranian languages is likely to disappear.

Assistant professor Maryam Borjian of Rutgers University states that Mazanderani has different sub-dialects and there is high mutual intelligibility among Mazanderani sub-dialects.

The dialects of Mazanderani are Saravi, Amoli, Baboli, Ghaemshahri, Chalusi, Nuri, Shahsavari, Ghasrani, Shahmirzadi, Damavandi, Firoozkoohi, Astarabadi, and Katouli. The native people of Sari, Qaem Shahr, Babol, Amol, Nowshahr, Chalus, and Tonekabon are Mazanderani people and speak the Mazanderani language.

== Genetics ==
The Mazanderanis and the closely related Gilaks occupy the south Caspian region of Iran and speak languages belonging to the North-Western branch of Iranian languages. It has been suggested that their ancestors came from the Caucasus region, perhaps displacing an earlier group in the South Caspian. Linguistic evidence supports this scenario, in that the Gilaki and Mazanderani languages (but not other Iranian languages) share certain typological features with Caucasian languages.

Based on mtDNA HV1 sequences, the Gilaki and Mazanderani most closely resemble their geographic and linguistic neighbors, namely other Iranian groups. However, their Y chromosome types most closely resemble those found in groups from the South Caucasus. Researchers have interpreted these differences as demonstrating that peoples from the Caucasus settled in the south Caspian area and mated with peoples from local Iranian groups, possibly because of patrilocality. The Mazanderani and Gilaki groups are closely related on the male side with populations from the South Caucasus such as Georgians, Armenians, and Azerbaijanis.

=== Haplogroups ===
Analysis of their NRY patrilines has revealed haplogroup J2, associated with the Neolithic diffusion of agriculturalists from the Near East, to be the predominant Y-DNA lineage among the Mazanderani (subclades J2a2h- J2a2b M67 and J2a-M410, more specifically.). The next most frequently occurring lineage, R1a1a, believed to have been associated with early Iranian expansion into Central/Southern Eurasia and currently ubiquitous in that area, is found in almost 25%,. This haplogroup, with the aforementioned J2, accounts for over 50% of the entire sample. Haplogroup G2a3b, attaining significant frequency together with G2a and G1, is the most commonly carried marker in the G group among Mazanderani men. The lineages E1b1b1a1a-M34 and C5-M356 comprise the remainder, of less than 10% sampled.

== Notable figures ==
=== Historic ===
- Abu Jafar Muhammad ibn Jarir ibn Yazid ibn Kathir al-Tabari (838–923) was a Mazanderani historian and theologian (the most famous and widely influential person called al-Tabari).
- Abu Jafar Muhammad ibn Jarir ibn Rustom al-Tabari was a Shia thinker who is commonly confused with the former. He is the author of the book Dala'il al-Imamah (Proofs of the Imamate)
- Ali ibn Sahl Rabban al-Tabari, "Ali the scholar from Tabiristan" (838–870 A.D.), was the writer of a medical encyclopedia and the teacher of the scholar physician Zakariya al-Razi.
- Abul Hasan al-Tabari, a 10th-century Iranian physician
- Al-Tabarani (c. 821–918 AD), author of numerous hadith
- Amir Pazevari, poet
- Maziar, Iranian aristocrat of the House of Karen

=== Contemporary ===
- Reza Shah, Shah of Iran (Persia) from 1924 to 1941
- Nima Yooshij, poet, 1941
- Mina Assadi, poet
- Emamali Habibi, Olympic and world champion of free-style wrestling/Babr e Mazandaran
- Ali Larijani, former member of the Supreme National Security Council of Iran and Speaker of the Majlis of Iran
- Simin Ghanem, Iranian classical and pop singer
- Hassan Yazdani, wrestler
- Komeil Ghasemi, wrestler
- Bashir Babajanzadeh, wrestler
- Hamed Talebi, wrestler
- Reza Atri, wrestler
- Mohammad Javad Larijani, mathematician and former member of the Majlis
- Sadegh Larijani, former head of the judiciary of the Islamic Republic of Iran
- Mohammad Zohari, poet
- Mohsen Bengar, footballer
- Delkash, singer
- Ali Pahlavan, singer
- Ehsan Tabari, Marxist theoretician
- Noureddin Kianouri, politician
- Parinaz Izadyar, actress
- Parviz Natel-Khanlari, writer/translator
- Reza Allamehzadeh, director
- Behdad Salimikordasiabi, Olympic weightlifter
- Abdollah Movahed, freestyle wrestler - Olympic champion
- Abbas-Ali Soleimani, Shia cleric and politician
- Mohammad-Ali Taskhiri, Shia cleric and diplomat
- Yasubedin Rastegar Jooybari, Shia marja
- Abdollah Javadi-Amoli, Shia marja and politician
- Shahab ud-Din Mar'ashi Najafi, Arab-descended Mazanderani Iranian Shia cleric
- Mirza Hashem Amoli, Shia marja
- Alireza Firouzja, chess super grandmaster and the youngest player to have surpassed a FIDE rating of 2,800
- Farya Faraji, musicologist and composer

== Assimilated populations in Mazandaran ==
In the Safavid, Afsharid, and Qajar eras Mazandaran was settled by large numbers of Georgians, Armenians, and other peoples of the Caucasus, whose descendants still live across Mazandaran. The names of many towns, villages and neighbourhoods in Mazandaran reflect this legacy by bearing variations of the name "Gorji" (i.e., Georgian), although most of the Georgians are assimilated into the mainstream Mazanderanis. The history of Georgian settlement is described by Iskandar Beg Munshi, the author of the 17th century History of Alam Aray Abbasi. In addition, European travelers such as Chardin and Della Valle have written about their encounters with the Georgian, Circassian and Armenian Mazanderanis.

== See also ==
- Caspian people
- Māzandarān Province
- Peoples of the Caucasus
- Iranian peoples
- List of famous people from Mazandaran
- Mazanderani language
- Mazanderani dance
