= List of Persian violinists =

This is a list of notable Persian and Iranian violinists.

== Persian violinists ==
- Abolhasan Saba (1902–1957)
- Parviz Yahaghi (1936–2007)
- Ruhollah Khaleghi (1906–1965)
- Ali-Naqi Vaziri (1887–1979)
- Ali Tajvidi (1919–2006)
- Homayoun Khorram (1930–2013)
- Shahrdad Rohani (born 1954)
- Khachik Babayan (born 1956)
- Mojtaba Mirzadeh (1945–2005)
- Arsalan Kamkar (born 1960)
- Mahmoud Zolfonoun (1920–2013)
- Reza Mahjubi (1898–1954)
- Bijan Mortazavi (born 1957)
