= Bijan Mortazavi =

Iranian musician (born 1957)

Bijan Mortazavi بیژن مرتضوی
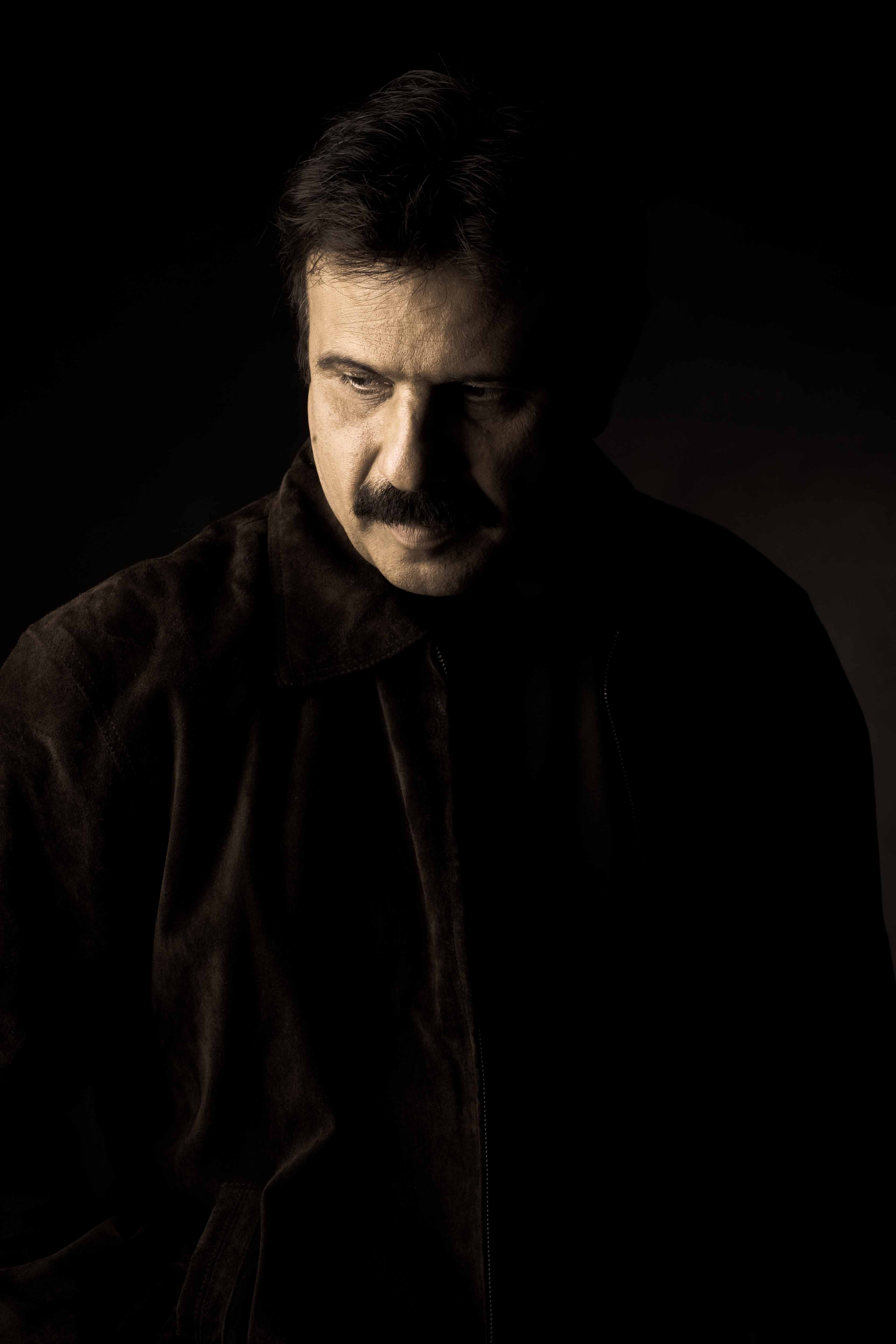
- Mortazavi in 2009

Background information
- Born: November 16, 1957 (age 68); Juybar, Mazandaran, Imperial State of Iran
- Origin: Iranian
- Genres: Pop, instrumental music
- Occupations: Violinist, songwriter, singer, composer, civil engineer
- Instruments: Violin, piano, guitar, percussive & ethnic instruments
- Labels: Avang Records, Caltex Records, Radio Javan
- Website: bijanmusic.com

Bijan Mortazavi (Persian: بیژن مرتضوی; (Note: Persian pronunciation: [biːˈʒæne moɾtæzæˈvi]) born November 16, 1957) is an Iranian virtuoso violinist, musician, composer, songwriter, arranger and singer. He is known for collaborating with famous iranian composer Sadegh Nojouki and Instrumental music.

== Biography ==
=== Musical education ===
Born in the city of Juybar, Iran. Mortazavi studied music in Tehran. He was trained in improvisation, orchestration, arrangement, quarter tone technique, and dastgah by various well-known violinists in Iran.

Mortazavi started learning the violin under the supervision of Masoud Namazian when he was three years old. In a Nowruz 1991 interview with Alireza Amirghassemi on The Tapesh Show, Mortazavi claimed that as part of his tutelage, Namazian had him focus for the first three months only on music theory to learn the notes and scales and then apply them to the violin, as Mortazavi did not attend music school, and advised his parents to not let him touch the violin during that time. Mortazavi claimed his mother hid his violin in a cupboard for that period, although he would often play on the violin in secret until his mother eventually caught him. He would later take lessons from Ali Tajvidi, Parviz Yahaghi, Habibollah Badiei, Jahangir Kamiyan.

At the age of seven, he also started playing the piano, guitar, percussion, and folk string instruments such as oud, tar, and santur.

Mortazavi won his first prize at the age of eleven in a national music contest among students of all ages in Iran. He was fourteen when he conducted a 32-person orchestra, performing his own compositions and arrangements at the Ramsar Summer Camp in Iran.

After graduating from high school, Mortazavi moved to the United Kingdom. There, he pursued his academic interest in the field of civil engineering while continuing to train and perform on the violin.

=== Professional career ===
In 1979, Mortazavi moved to the United States, continued his music and engineering education at Texas State University, and eventually settled in California in 1985. There he started composing and arranging music for Iranian pop singers, and playing the violin. He released his first album, Bijan Mortazavi: Magic of His Music and His Songs, in 1990, and it became a best-seller among Persian albums that year. Mortazavi was interviewed on The Tapesh Show for the 1991 Persian New Year, at the end of which he performed the album's first song, "Asheghi Chieh", along with "Gole Sangam", on the piano, singing along with Sattar, Shahrum K and the show's presenters, to close the final Nowrooz episode.

After the release of his album Bijan Mortazavi 3, which featured Mortazavi's talents as a violinist and singer, his next album, Fire on Ice (Instrumental), was a combination of Persian-style violin and new-age instrumental music. He released two more albums, Sweet Scent of Love and Voice of Silence, in 1999 and 2001, respectively.

In 2004 Bijan released the album Ye Ghatreh Darya, an upbeat dance album that included a Kordish style dance-music, rhythm and circle-dance track titled "Ronak". The album has been played at many Persian weddings and parties.

His 2006 album, Be Man Che, featured lyrics written by the Iranian poet Iraj Janatie Ataie, who has written lyrics for Iranian pop singers such as Ebi, Dariush and Googoosh. Ataie himself declaimed the poetic lyrics at the beginning of the title track.

Since the album Fire on Ice, Mortazavi's albums have been a combination of instrumental and vocal pieces. What sets him apart from other performers is his ability to personally play all the instruments used in his arrangements.

On November 25, 2009, Bijan received his Fellowship (PhD) from Southampton Solent University in Great Britain, in recognition of his work on the development of contemporary middle eastern music in an academic form in United Kingdom and other western countries.

On November 16, 2010, his latest album (Music and I) was released.

On July 12, 2017, Southampton Solent University awarded him the honorary degree of Doctor of Music.

=== Instrument ===
Mortazavi always uses a white, handmade violin in his performances. "I like to play my white violin because to me white represents peace and friendship", Mortazavi said in a TV interview.

== Concerts ==
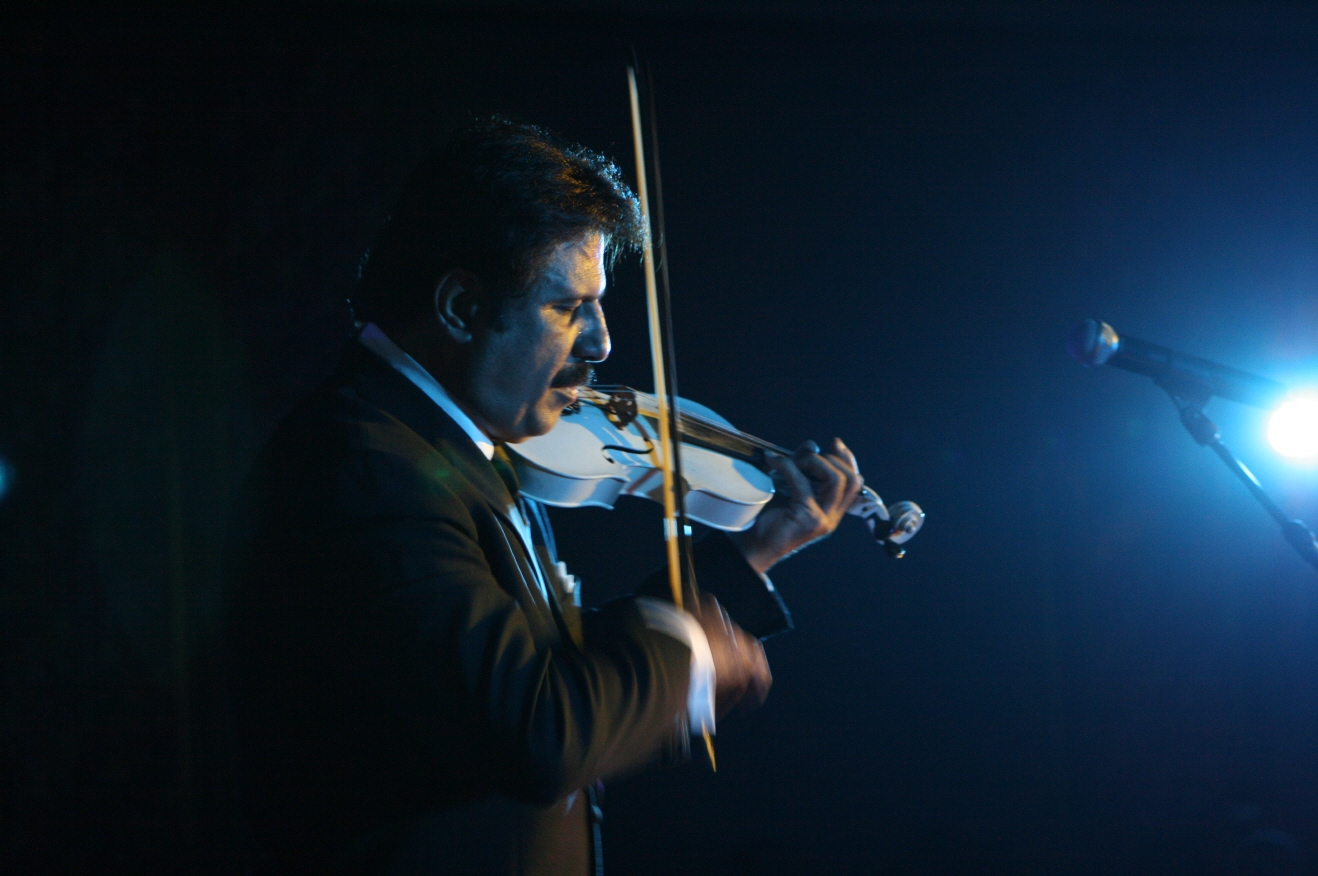
Bijan in Kuala Lumpur Malaysia 2008 Concert

Since 1990, international tours have brought Mortazavi to sold-out audiences throughout the world. In 1995 he was the first Iranian artist to be sponsored by the Chrysler Corporation.

=== Greek Theatre and other venues ===
On July 3, 1994, Bijan Mortazavi performed his music with an orchestra at the Greek Theatre in Los Angeles, becoming the first Iranian musician to be featured at the theatre. One of the pieces he played during this concert, entitled "Epic", had been written by him when he was eleven years old. A video of the concert has been released as Bijan Live at the Greek Theatre.

Bijan has performed in other big venues around the world, among them the Shrine Auditorium in Los Angeles, the Gibson Amphitheater (aka Universal Amphitheater) in Universal City, California, the Kodak Theatre in Hollywood and Highland Center, the Royal Albert Hall, Equinox and Le Palace in London, the Ford Center, Performing Arts Center, Roy Thomson Hall in Toronto, Queen Elizabeth Auditorium in Vancouver, the Albert Hall in Copenhagen, the Nobel Concert Hall and Global Auditorium in Stockholm, and the Performing arts center and Civic Auditoriums, Kuwait Opera House in KUWAIT CITY for 2 consecutive nights, also Sydney Opera House with Philharmonic Orchestra members which was a sell out concert and took place on March of 2025 in Sydney Australia, Perth, Melbourne, Brisbane, Adelaide and Auckland in New Zealand.

== Discography ==
=== Studio albums ===
- 1990 – Bijan Mortazavi: The Magic of His Music and His Songs (Bijan Mortazavi 1)
- 1992 – Bijan Mortazavi 2
- 1994 – Bijan Mortazavi 3 (instrumental album)
- 1994 – Bijan Mortazavi 3 (vocal album)
- 1997 – Fire on Ice (instrumental album)
- 1997 – Fire on Ice (vocal album)
- 1999 – Sweet Scent of Love
- 2001 – Voice of Silence
- 2004 – Yeh Ghatreh Darya
- 2006 – Beh Man Cheh
- 2010 – Music and I
- 2022 – Flight of The Phoenix
- 2023 - Bijan's Camp (Violin Rap)

=== Live albums ===
- 1994 – Bijan Live at the Greek Theatre

=== Music videos ===
- 1994 – Bijan Live at the Greek Theatre
- 2003 – "Ye Ghatreh Darya" from the album Ye Ghatreh Darya
- 2003– "Gerye Konam Ya Nakonam" from the album Ye Ghatreh Darya
- 2003 – "Ronak" from the album Ye Ghatreh Darya
- 2003 – "Lavand" from the album Ye Ghatreh Darya
- 2003 – "Rainbow" from the album Ye Ghatreh Darya
- 2004 – Bijan in Concert
- 2005 – "Be man Che" from the album Be man Che
- 2005 – "Ey Maah" from the album Be man Che
- 2005 – "Kaash Mishod" from the album Be man Che
- 2005 – "ma ro daste kam nagir" from the album Be man Che
- 2010 – "Axe To" from the album Music and I
- 2010 – "Man o Toe" from the album Music and I
- 2010 – "Noor o Booseh" from the album Music and I
- 2010 – "Da'vat" from the album Music and I
- 2011 – Animated video of "Moosighi o Man" from the album Music and I
- 2014 – "Asheghtaram Kardi" music video as a single
- 2015 – "Ayriliq" video with Ukraine Symphonic Orchestra, as a single
- 2016 – "Ashegh naboodi" music video as a single
- 2016 – "Azizam" music video as a single
- 2016 – "Eshveh" from the album Bijan 2
- 2017 – "Kaash" music video as a single
- 2017 – "Gelayeh" music video as a single

== See also ==
- Iraj Janatie Ataie
- List of Iranian musicians
- List of Persian violinists
- Moein
- Music of Iran
- Persian pop music
- Pouya Jalili Pour
