= Asadollah Malek =

- Born: 5 August 1941; Tehran, Iran
- Died: 29 January 2002 (aged 60) Tehran, Iran
- Genres: Persian classical music
- Occupations: Musician, composer
- Instruments: Violin, kamancheh

Asadollah Malek (5 August 1941 – 29 January 2002) was an Iranian violinist and composer associated with Persian classical music. He was active in Iranian radio and television music programmes and was associated with the Golha radio programme.

== Early life and education ==
Malek was born in Tehran on 5 August 1941. According to IRNA, he began practising the violin as a child and later studied with Abolhasan Saba. He then entered the National Music Conservatory, where his teachers included Ruhollah Khaleqi and Ali-Mohammad Khadem Misagh.

== Career ==
Malek began working with radio at the age of 17. His early reputation was linked to the composition and performance of "Gerye-ye Leili" in Dashti. His first vocal composition was "Hekayat-e Del", written with lyrics by Bijan Taraghi and broadcast on radio.

Malek became active in the Golha programme as both a violinist and composer. The Golha Project states that his reputation in the programme was connected to both his violin playing and his compositions. The same source notes that he performed in radio and television programmes, recorded works, and gave concerts outside Iran.

According to Toos Foundation, Malek worked with musicians and singers including Delkash, Akbar Golpayegani and Mohammad-Reza Shajarian. IRNA also reports that he collaborated with artists including Ahmad Ebadi, Farhang Sharif, Fazlollah Tavakol, Golpayegani and Mahmoudi Khansari.

== Death ==
Malek died on 29 January 2002 after a brain illness.

== Selected works ==
- "Gerye-ye Leili"
- "Hekayat-e Del"
- "Sama"
