= Parviz Yahaghi =

Background information
- Born: September 23, 1935; Tehran, Iran
- Died: February 2, 2007 (aged 71) Tehran, Iran
- Genres: Persian pop music, Persian traditional music
- Occupations: Violinist, composer, singer
- Years active: –2007

Parviz Yahaghi (Persian: پرویز یاحقی; September 23, 1935 – February 2, 2007) was a distinguished Iranian composer and violinist. He resided in Tehran for practically his whole life, and was born and died there.

== Biography ==
His birth name was Parviz Sedighi Parsi. He was musically educated primarily by his uncle Hossein Yahaghi, a violinist and violin teacher, from whom Parviz adopted the Yahaghi name.

During his youth Parviz was exposed to many highly professional musicians in Tehran who were friends of his uncle.

A notable visitor at his uncle's house was the violin teacher, composer, and musicologist Abolhasan Saba, who is credited with making improvements in violin playing technique in the Persian tradition. Saba published a two-volume training manual for the violin in 1944-45.

== Works ==
Starting from about 20 years, Parviz Yahaghi was employed for a little over two decades as a musician with the Iranian government-financed radio station.

In the 1960s and 1970s at the radio station he composed hundreds of pieces both for violin and for celebrated singers in Iran such as Banan, Marzieh, Delkash, Pouran, Elahe, Homeyra, Mahasti, Dariush Rafei, Homayoonpour and Iraj (Hossein Khajeh Amiri). These compositions were often produced in connection with the long-running radio program Golha.

Yahaghi's ability in playing violin, his compositions, and his musical director's role made him a central figure in Persian music during the 1970s.

Yahaghi's violin is tuned in a way that gives different resonances and drones to the sound, compared to standard European tuning, and he uses a number of different tuning schemes.

Before the arrival of the 1979 political revolution in Iran, Yahaghi had already resigned from the government radio station and set up a recording studio of his own in Tehran. In the wake of the revolution, many of Yahaghi's friends and associates departed from Iran and did not return. But Yahaghi stayed. His wife, Homeyra, one of Iran's most famous singers, moved permanently to the USA without him. (The revolutionaries outlawed female solo singing, though women were free to continue to play musical instruments and to sing in choruses.) Yahaghi was arrested, interrogated, and released by the new regime. During the 1980s with the war between Iran and Iraq going on, he was invited by the regime to compose music, particularly patriotic music. He declined.

But the official authorities came around to viewing him with such esteem that after his death some of his musical instruments, recording equipment and other items were appropriated as national and historic property.

== Discography ==
Parviz Yahaghi's most widely distributed recordings outside Iran is probably the five-volume "Persian Melodies" collection (five compact discs); the four-volume "Violin Melodies" collection is the same thing as the first four volumes of "Persian Melodies".

=== Albums ===
Other albums by Yahaghi currently in print include:

- "Toreh" in two volumes (i.e. two compact discs);
- "Tooba" (a.k.a. Tobi) in two volumes;
- "Taravat" in two volumes;
- the three-volume set headlined "Iranian Classical Music" whose three volumes are called Ashk & Tulu, Yad, and Faryad;
- other albums by Yahaghi in print include "Kimia", "Saz-e Del", "Mehr", "Mahtab", and "Raaz & Niyaz".

These albums don't contain any overlap in recorded material with themselves or with the Violin Melodies collection, although at times one hears some recurring themes being reworked and replayed. All these albums are instrumental only (no singing) and monophonic only. (The many early recordings of Yahaghi playing with a singer are published under the singer's name).

=== Taknavazan Collection ===
Additional instrumental music featuring Yahaghi is available from the Taknavazan Collection. This collection consists of forty compact discs of Persian traditional instrumental music, featuring the violin on the majority of the tracks.

Yahaghi plays violin on at least one track on at least 25 of the 40 compact discs. Each disc has approximately four tracks.

Other violinists in the Persian tradition who are present in this Taknavazan Collection are Ali Tajvidi (علی تجویدی), Habibollah Badiei (حبیب الله بدیعی), Homayoun Khorram (همايون خرم), and Asadollah Malek (اسدالله ملک). They were all students of Abolhasan Saba in Tehran. They had also similar aesthetics and technique of Yahaghi.
