= Homa Mirafshar =

Iranian poet (1936–2026)

Maestro Homa Mirafshar
- هما میرافشار
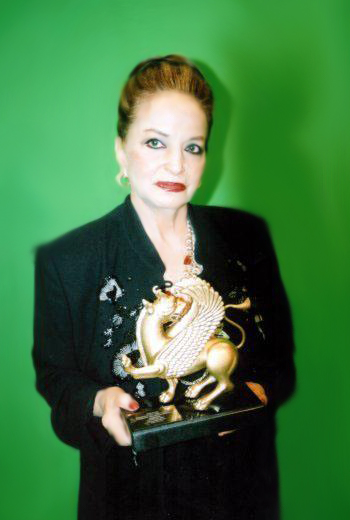
- Homa Mirafshar receiving WAALM Award 2006
- Born: Nezhat Homayoun; 24 February 1936; Tehran, Iran
- Died: 2 June 2026 (aged 90); Los Angeles, California, U.S.
- Known for: Collaboration with Golpa, Homeyra, Mahasti, Hayedeh, Moein, Sattar, Shahrokh, Ebi, Dariush
- Spouse: Ali Mirafshar
- Awards: The World Academy of Arts, Literature, and Media - WAALM AWARDS OF 2006

Homa Mirafshar (Persian: هما میرافشار; 24 February 1936 – 2 June 2026) was an Iranian poet, journalist, and songwriter based in the United States.

Famous Iranian musicians such as Manoucher Cheshmazar and Mohammad Heydari have remarked on how well her poems integrate with rhythm and melody, and audiences have recognised these signature elements in her work.

== Background ==
Mirafshar was born in Tehran to the artistic Homayoun family. She started composing poetry as a child in elementary school. She married Ali Mirafshar, the cousin of Iranian singer Homeyra, and Homa and Homeyra collaborated on songs. Mirafshar had two children, Keyvan and Katayoun. Mirafshar died in Los Angeles on 2 June 2026, at the age of 90.

== Persian Golden Lioness Awards ==
The World Academy of Arts, Literature, and Media – WAALM AWARDS OF 2006 – Best Lyricist
