= Golpaygani =

Golpaygani, alternatively spelled Golpayegani, (Persian: گلپایگانی) is an Iranian surname. Notable people with the surname include:

- Akbar Golpayegani (1934–2023), Iranian traditional singer
- Hashem Bathaie Golpayegani (1941–2020), Iranian Shia Ayatollah
- Lotfollah Safi Golpaygani (1919–2022), Iranian Grand Ayatollah
- Mohammad Mohammadi Golpayegani (born c. 1943), Chief of Staff of the Office of the Supreme Leader of Iran
- Mohammad-Reza Golpaygani (1899–1993), Iranian Grand Ayatollah
