= Persian Broadcasting Company =

Persian-American television network

Persian Broadcasting Company (PBC) | Tapesh
- Type: broadcast television network
- Country: United States
- Availability: United States, Canada, Iran, Middle East, Australia
- Headquarters: Los Angeles, California, U.S.
- Owner: Alireza Amirghassemi and Masoud jamali
- Key people: Alireza Amirghassemi and Masoud Jamali
- Launch date: October 1989
- Official website: https://www.instagram.com/tapesh/

The Persian Broadcasting Company (also known as Tapesh, Persian: طپش (lit. 'heartbeat') or Tapesh Media, LLC) is a Persian-language television company based in the United States, launched in October 1989. It was founded by Alireza Amirghassemi and Masoud Jamali, consists of two channels, Tapesh 1 and Tapesh 2; a magazine; and a record company. The Persian Broadcasting Company network was closed in 2009; then reopened under the name PBC Tapesh.

== About ==
Programming consists of news and talk shows, music concerts, sitcoms, movies, variety shows, sports, entertainment, mini-series, drama, music videos, red carpet events and children's programs. The 24-hour television broadcasts broadcast and produced entertainment, music and sports programs, and were available on the five continents through the satellite and in the United States and Australia via cable. Farsi T2 languages, which are dedicated exclusively to music videos, have a common threading network.

It is broadcast in North America, Europe, North Africa, Australia, New Zealand, Far East, and the Middle East, and is the only Persian channel in New Zealand and Australia. The company's world headquarters and production facilities are located in Los Angeles, California with satellite offices in New York, Vancouver, London, Dubai, Kuala Lumpur and Sydney.

== Owner steps down ==
The owner and CEO of Tapesh (Persian Broadcasting Company) stepped down and Alireza Amirghassemi became the new CEO of the network.

== See also ==
- Iranian Americans
