= Ghoghaye Setaregan =

1960s song

Song by Parvin; Mohammad Esfahani
- Language: Persian
- English title: Ghoghaye Setaregan
- Genre: Persian traditional music
- Composer: Homayoon Khorram
- Lyricist: Karim Fakoor

"Ghoghaye Setaregan" (Persian: غوغای ستارگان, meaning "Turmoil of the Stars"), also known as "Emshab Dar Sar Shoori Daram" (امشب در سر شوری دارم, meaning "Tonight Inside My Head There is a Delight"), is a 1960s song composed by Homayoon Khorram in Dastgah-e Shur and its lyrics was later written by Karim Fakoor in Persian and sung by Parvin Zahraee Monfared. In 2000, the owner of the piece, Homayoun Khoram, selected Kambiz Roshanravan to arrange the orchestra and Mohammad Esfahani as the singer. The studio recording was done under his supervision and it was released as "Oje Aseman" (اوج آسمان) on Tanha Mandam album along with 6 other works.

== Non-compliance with copyright ==
Reza Khoram (son of Homayoun Khoram) published a letter of protest from the news agencies, including the violation of copyright in the "Noise of the Stars" section. He stated: "Gentlemen, it has been read. In many cases, the performances are very poor, the settings are inappropriate, the orchestration is unfavorable, the original composition of the song is awkwardly changed, the introduction and answers of the orchestra are removed or shortened, personal tastes are applied, and so on. All rights to these works in terms of music and song belong to our family, so seriously and legally and without compliments to art thieves who in any form, including cyberspace, concert performance, release of audio or video CD, music notation in the form Books, etc. Abuse of these works will be dealt with severely."

== Song lyrics with English translation ==
The lyrics of the song, based on the poem by Karim Fakur fa, are as follows:

Tonight, a thrill runs through my mind,	امشب در دل نوری دارم	امشب در سر شوری دارم
Tonight, in the heights of the sky I soar,	رازی باشد با ستارگانم	باز امشب در اوج آسمانم
Tonight, I'm all passion and ecstasy,	از این عالم گویی دورم	امشب یک سر شوق و شورم
With joy, I spread my wings to the heavens,	سرود هستی خوانم در بر حور و ملک	از شادی پر گیرم که رسم به فلک
I stir the heavens into turmoil,	سبو بریزم ساغر شکنم	در آسمان‌ها غوغا فکنم
Tonight, I'm all passion and ecstasy,	از این عالم گویی دورم	امشب یک سر شوق و شورم
I speak with the moon and the Pleiades,	وز روی مه خود اثری جویم	با ماه و پروین سخنی گویم
I find life in these nights,	جان یابم زین شب‌ها	جان یابم زین شب‌ها
I make the Moon and Venus dance,	از خود بی‌خبرم ز شعف دارم	ماه و زهره را به طرب آرم
A melody rises on my lips,	نغمه‌ای بر لب‌ها	نغمه‌ای بر لب‌ها
Tonight, I'm all passion and ecstasy,	از این عالم گویی دورم	امشب یک سر شوق و شورم
Tonight, a thrill runs through my mind,	امشب در دل نوری دارم	امشب در سر شوری دارم
Tonight, in the heights of the sky I soar,	رازی باشد با ستارگانم	باز امشب در اوج آسمانم
Tonight, I'm all passion and ecstasy,	از این عالم گویی دورم	امشب یک سر شوق و شورم

== In Azerbaijani ==
This song has been translated into Azerbaijani under the title “Ulduzlar Bəzmində” with lyrics by Saleh Sajadi (Azerbaijani: Saleh Səcadi) and sung by Farghana Qasimova (Azerbaijani: Fərqanə Qasımova).
