= Farhang Sharif =

Iranian musician (1931–2016)

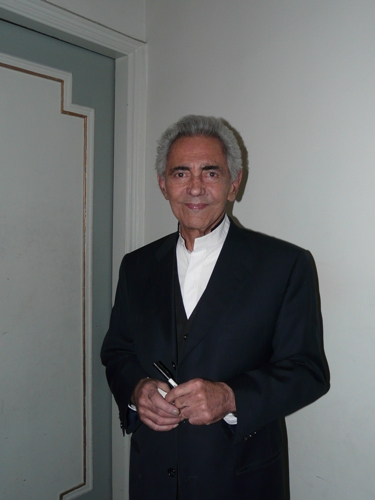

Background information
- Born: Farhang Sharif; March 22, 1931; Amol, Iran
- Origin: Tehran, Iran
- Died: 7 September 2016 (aged 85)
- Genres: Persian traditional music
- Occupation: Musician
- Instrument: Tar
- Website: www.farhangsharif.com

Farhang Sharif (Persian: فرهنگ شریف; c. 22 March 1931 – 7 September 2016) was an Iranian musician and renowned tar player.

== Biography ==
Farhang Sharif began learning music from his father at a young age. He learned to play the tar from Abdolhossein Shahnazi and Morteza Neidavoud, two masters who lived during the Qajar and Pahlavi periods. As a result, he performed his first radio solo at the age of 12. Sharif has collaborated with notable musicians such as Mohammad-Reza Shajarian, Akbar Golpayegani, Gholam Hossein Banan, Iraj and Mahmoud Khansari. He also performed at a music festival in Berlin. Sharif is considered one of the greatest tar players and traditional composers of modern Iranian history. He is often referred to as "ostad", which means "master" in Persian. Owing to restrictions on musical activities following the Iranian Revolution, he settled in the United States in 1980. After returning to Iran in 2000, he was active as a performer and teacher. He has also made inventions in the domains of previously undiscovered acoustic tar effects and special tunings. He died of a respiratory problem at his home in Tehran at the age of 85. He is one of the most cherished classical Persian musicians whose oeuvre appeals to thousands of Persian and non-Persian lovers of classical Persian music.

== Achievements ==
- Sharif was awarded the first rank badge of art equal to doctorate degree, by President Mohammad Khatami.

== See also ==
- Music of Iran
- List of Iranian musicians
