= Pouya Pourjalil =

Iranian Singer

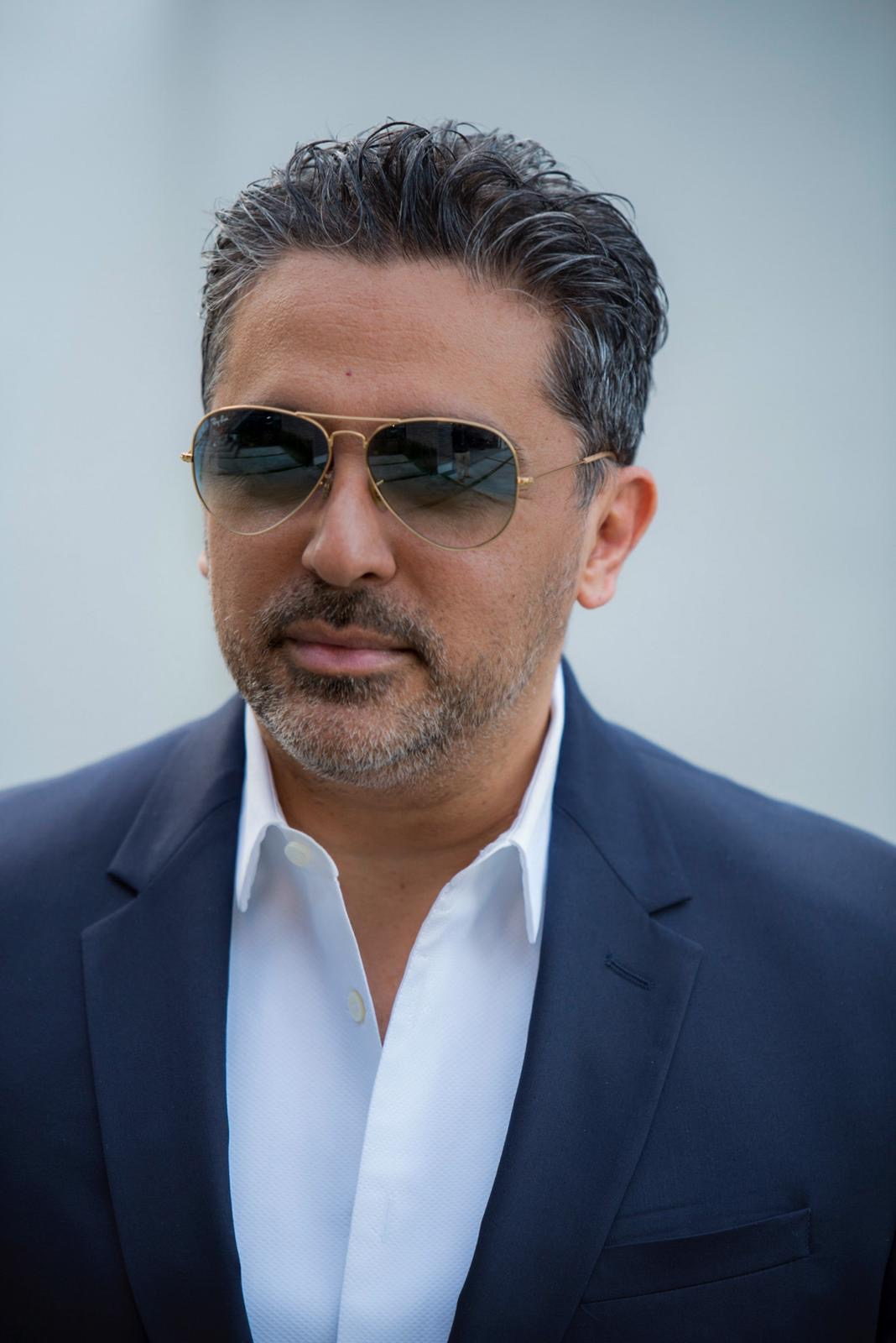

Background information
- Also known as: Pouyamusic
- Born: January 5, 1976 (age 50); Bandar-e Anzali, Iran
- Genres: Pop
- Occupation: Singer
- Years active: 1999–present
- Label: Mahan Entertainment
- Website: www.pouyaofficial.com

Pouya Pourjalil (born January 5, 1976, born in Bandar-e Anzali, Iran) is an Iranian pop singer.

== Biography ==
Pourjalil was born on January 5, 1976, in Bandar-e Anzali, a city in northern Iran. He grew up in a family of four. When Pourjalil was ten years old, his parents and younger sister moved to Norway and lived there for seven years before he moved to London to pursue his love and passion for music.

He lived in London for five years where he started his professional career as a Persian singer. While living in London, Pourjalil attended several classes to enhance his music skills and knowledge. He also performed at various Persian night clubs and concert halls.

At an early age, he focused his efforts at a place where the Persian music industry was growing more, with better opportunities, which then later brought him to Los Angeles.

After his arrival in Los Angeles, he started working with the entertainment company, Taraneh Enterprises, who were in charge of his album releases, as well as his marketing and advertisement.

His first album was released in 2000 by Taraneh Enterprises. As of February 2020, Pourjalil has published seven albums, working with Persian songwriters, producers, composers, etc.

He has over 30 music videos.

His hobbies are shooting, movies, camping, swimming, boxing and cooking.

After touring the world for several years, Pourjalil has been making new music and recording. He states that his albums are a culmination of many years of experience and offer a new experience for his fans while retaining all the elements of his past albums.

In 2020, Sasy, an Iranian singer living in the United States, released a video clip titled "Doctor". The video's content sparked many protests in cyberspace. One of the critics who severely condemned Sasy was Pouya Pourjalil. He strongly criticized the Iranian singer on his personal Instagram page.

== Albums ==
- 2000 Ghatreh Baran
- 2002 Gharibaneh
- 2004 Roya
- 2008 Tasvir
- 2014 Tabe Tond
- 2016 Rabeteh

== Singles ==
- 2009 Rahayi (ft Helen & Black Cats)
- 2013 Dari Miri
- 2014 Tarkam Kon
- 2016 Bigharar
- 2016 Ghorse Khab
- 2017 Fardaye Khoob
- 2017 Doret Beghardam
- 2017 Sharab
- 2018 Boghz
- 2018 Irane Man (ft. Hamed Fard)
- 2018 Mahtab
- 2019 Adamo Hava
- 2019 Cheshmaye Naz
- 2020 Khoshbakhti
- 2020 Kenare Raftanet
- 2020 Arezouye Man
- 2020 Nafas
- 2020 Bahooneh
- 2020 Tanhaei
- 2020 Vay Az To
- 2021 Bikhiyali
- 2022 Baba
- 2022 Vatan (Mahsa Amini)
- 2022 Bia Bejang (Mahsa Amini)
- 2023 Hale Khoob
- 2023 Rahaeei
- 2023 Shahe Man
- 2023 Miravam
- 2023 Taghdir
- 2024 Maste Eshgh
- 2024 Divanegi (ft Morvarid Raeesi)
- 2024 Mamnoonam

== See also ==
- Persian pop music
