= Alireza Amirghassemi =

Iranian TV producer and presenter

- علیرضا امیرقاسمی
- Born: September 19, 1965; Tehran, Iran
- Citizenship: United States
- Known for: Founder of Persian Broadcasting Corporation (PBC/Tapesh)
- Television: Tapesh

Alireza Amirghassemi (Persian: علیرضا امیرقاسمی; born September 19, 1965) is the producer and founder of the television channel Persian Broadcasting Company (PBC) and a concert producer for Iranian singers in Los Angeles. In October 1989, he launched the Tapesh TV (PBC) channel with Massoud Jamali.

== Early life and career ==
Amirghassemi was born on September 19, 1965, in Tehran. At the age of 13, he left Iran and emigrated to the United Kingdom, residing there for a short period of time. In 1978, he moved to the United States and started studying at Mira Mesa Senior High School in San Diego, California. At the age of 13, he won best playwriter in Tehran and was awarded by the city councils. He is one of the founding fathers of Iran's theater industry, Sadegh Bahrami.

After finishing high school, Amirghassemi continued his education by attending the University of California, Los Angeles College of Film, where he learned Western filmmaking and where he made music videos, music albums, and TV programs while attending college. He started his career at the age of 19, by producing an album called Neighbors (Hamsayeh Haa) sung by Siavash Shams, which became one of the most successful albums of that year. He is the founder of Tapash TV and T2. He is known as the "king of Iranian entertainment" for his influences on Persian television. He has been involved in numerous fields of entertainment as a film and television director, producer, host, executive producer, and the founder of Tapesh television network. He has performed over 1000 events and concerts worldwide in the past 40 years.

== Margins ==
Recently, an Iranian film had a focus about supporting the Islamic Revolutionary Guard Corps (IRGC). Opponents of the Islamic Republic of Iran argued with the film's actors at the time of its release. Amirghasemi supported the actors who played in the film and had protestors attack his personal page on Instagram and Facebook.
