= Ali Tajvidi =

Ali Tajvidi علی تجويدی
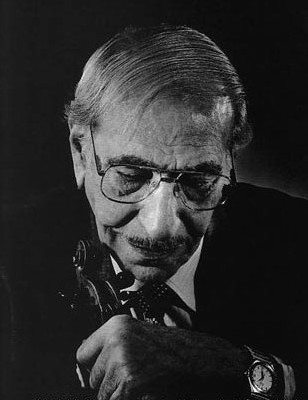

Background information
- Born: Ali Tajvidi; November 7, 1919; Tehran, Iran
- Died: March 15, 2006 (aged 86) Tehran, Iran
- Genres: Classical, folk, traditional
- Occupations: musician, conductor, violinist, songwriter, composer, professor
- Years active: 1940–1979

Ali Tajvidi (Persian: علی تجويدی; November 7, 1919 – March 15, 2006) was an Iranian musician, composer, violinist, songwriter, and music professor at the School of National Music and Tehran University. He composed more than 150 songs and discovered many Persian performers, including Delkash and Hayedeh, for whom he also produced music. He was born in Tehran, where his father was active as a painter in the style of Kamal-ol-Molk. In his youth, he took violin lessons for two years under Hossein Yahaghi (the uncle of Parviz Yahaghi) and for many years was under the tutelage of Abol-Hassan Saba for the violin as well. He also took harmony lessons under Houshang Ostovar.

After 1941, having developed his violin technique considerably, Tajvidi performed regularly as a violin soloist in Radio Iran programs. In later years, he conducted two orchestras, for which he wrote numerous compositions. Asheqi Sheyda, Be Yad-e Saba, Atash-e Karevan, Didi ke Rosva Shod Delam, and Sang-e Khara are among his best-known works. He wrote a three-volume book entitled Persian Music, which was published by the Soroush Publishing Company. In 1978, the Iranian government acknowledged his musical accomplishments by awarding him its highest artistic medal.

During his career Tajvidi cooperated with outstanding contemporary artists including Delkash, Gholamhossein Banan, Hossein Qavami, Mahmoud Mahmoudi-Khansari, Akbar Golpaygani, Hossein Khajeh Amiri (a.k.a. Iraj), Jalil Shahnaz, Farhang Sharif, Habibollah Badiei, Parviz Yahaghi, Javad Maroufi, Faramarz Payvar, Mehdi Khaledi, Homayoun Khorram. Homeira, a noted singer, first became famous by the song (sabram ata kon) which was composed by Ali Tajvidi. Tajvidi also composed some songs that he played solo on the violin. He is regarded as one of the best violinists in Iran, on a par with Parviz Yahaghi. He also played the Setar. He made Radif which concerns the traditional music of Iran: maghami or dhastgahi for the violin.

== Famous Album ==
Yade ostad with Alireza Eftekhari
