= Amir Pazevari =

Amir Pazevari was a Babol Mazandarani Iranian poet with numerous works written in the Mazandarani language. He probably lived in the 17th century in the province of Mazandaran (Tabarestan), Iran.
