= Radio Iran =

Radio Iran رادیو ایران
- Iran
- Broadcast area: Tehran
- Frequencies: FM Medium wave 819 kHz, short wave 3250 kHz, 6100 kHz, 11680 kHz, ultra-short wave 102.3 MHz

Programming
- Language: Persian

Ownership
- Owner: Islamic Republic of Iran Broadcasting

History
- First air date: 4 May 1940; 85 years ago

Links
- Webcast: www.instagram.com/radioiran.ir
- Website: www.radioiran.ir

Radio Iran (Persian: رادیو ایران) is the oldest radio station in Iran. It was established by order of Reza Shah in the Kolah Ferangi mansion under the supervision of the Ministry of War on 1940. It is owned and operated by the government-owned Islamic Republic of Iran Broadcasting.

== History ==
In 1924, preparations were made for the use of wireless in the Ministry of War. In 1926, wireless was introduced to Iran. From 1932, wireless institutions were developed, which eventually led to the creation of radio. The Council of Ministers approved the use of radio on October 2, 1934, and regulations were established that required the permission of the Ministry of Posts, Telegraphs and Telephones to install antennas and use radios. In 1937, the preparations for the establishment of a radio center were made by the Ministry of Posts, Telegraphs and Telephones, and following this action, the Organization for Cultivating Thoughts was established. After constant delays, the German Telefunken sent the first radio frequency generators and transmissions in 1939. On May 4, 1940, the first radio transmitter in Iran was opened at the wireless location on the old road of Shemiran (now the Ministry of Communications). Since 1940, Radio Tehran has been running only 8 hours of programs in 24 hours, which included news, Iranian music, and religious, cultural, geographical, and historical discourses. In 1943, Radio Tehran added another section to the number of its previous sections, and its program was increased by three hours in the mornings. In 1945, programs were also broadcast for holidays.

=== After revolution ===
After the 1979 Iranian Revolution, this radio was renamed to the Voice of the Islamic Republic. But in 2003, this radio was again called by its old name. In November 2015, Radio Iran started broadcasting together with Ava, Qur'an, Javan and Ma'arif radio stations in the form of Radio Nama (video radio).

== Technology ==
At the beginning of its establishment, Radio Tehran had two transmitters, one for medium wave and the other for short wave. It used a studio in the location of the wireless office to broadcast its programs. In 1948, a transmitter was provided to the radio and a small studio was built in Arg square to broadcast news. In 1957, the name of "Radio Tehran" was changed to "Radio Iran" and later, a second transmitter named Radio Tehran was also started working next to Radio Iran, which at the beginning only broadcast music. In 1967 Radio Iran began broadcasting in FM and FM Stereo.
