= Radio Tehran =

Radio Tehran رادیو تهران
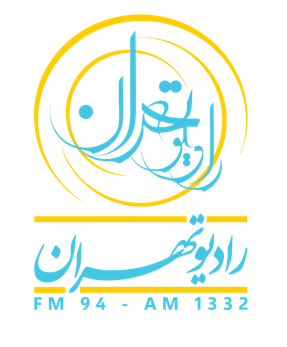

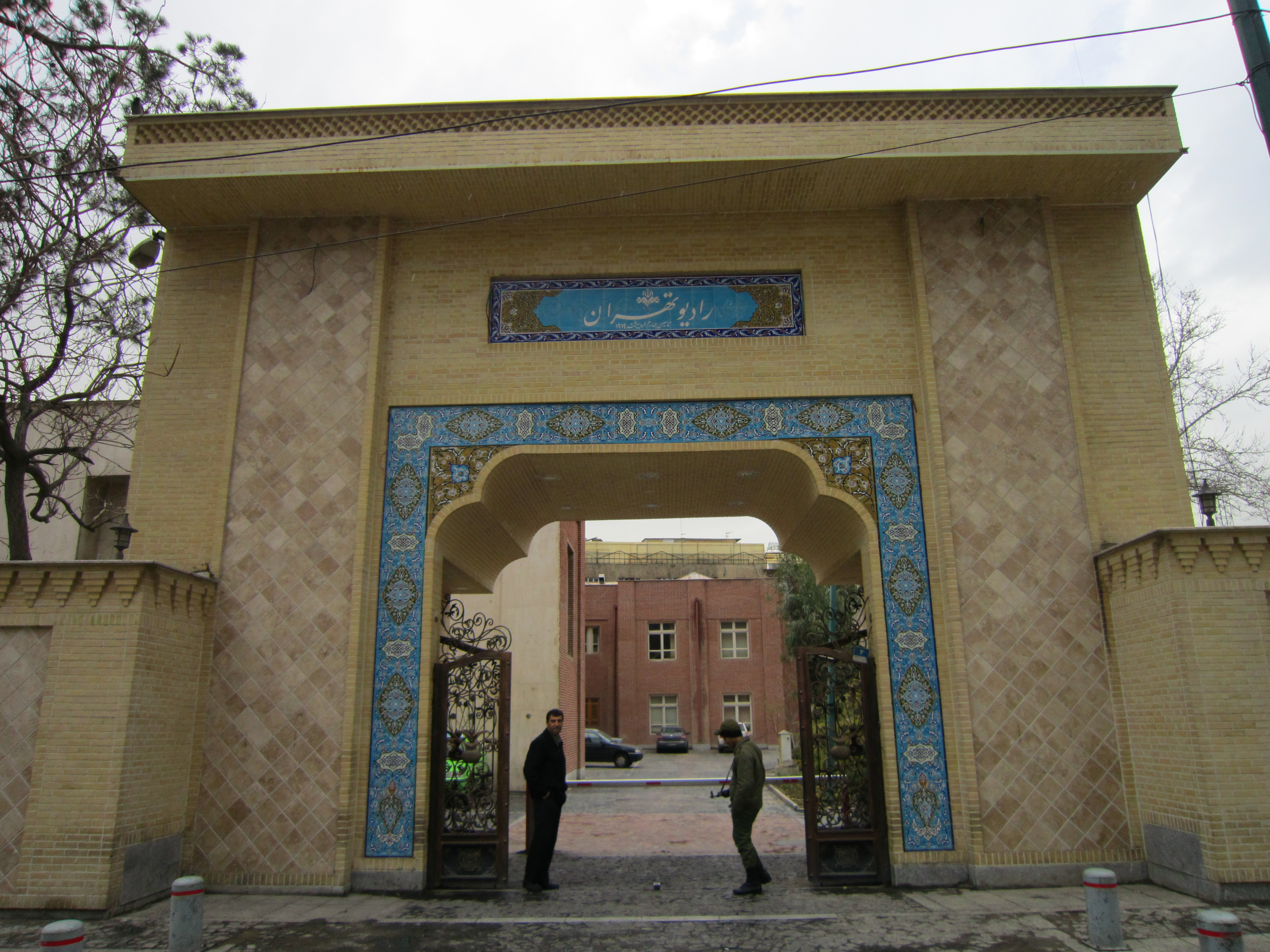
- Entrance to Radio Tehran
- Tehran; Iran
- Broadcast area: Tehran, Tehran province
- Frequencies: FM: 94 MHz, AM: 1332

Programming
- Language: Persian
- Format: News, talk, and music

Ownership
- Owner: IRIB
- Sister stations: Radio Iran

History
- First air date: 24 April 1940

Links
- Website: radiotehran.ir

Radio Tehran (Persian: رادیو تهران) is a radio station in Tehran, Iran, broadcasting content directed mainly at Tehran and Tehran province. It is fully owned and operated by the Iranian government through the Islamic Republic of Iran Broadcasting.

== History ==
Radio Tehran is the second oldest radio station in Iran, after Radio Iran. Initially, Radio Iran was called Radio Tehran, but in 1957 its name changed to Radio Iran while a second transmitter started working parallel to the first one. In 1960, a new department began working in Radio Iran, called Radio Tehran (or Program II) in order to cover more in depth the city of Tehran and the surroundings. Later it separated from Radio Iran. At the beginning it targeted a more elite audience, with emphasis on art and culture.

In 1993, Tehran Radio was established as a provincial group and from 12 November 1994, as an independent radio station and as Tehran Radio Network for the capital of Iran, which continues to work until now.

Broadcasting of Radio Tehran programs is 24 hours, which started on 13 August 1996, corresponding to 17 Rabi al-Awwal.
