= Abu al-Hasan al-Tabari =

Persian physician

Abu al-Hasan Ahmad ibn Muhammad al-Tabari, born in Amol, was a 10th-century Persian physician from Tabaristan. He was the physician of Rukn al-Dawla, a Buyid ruler.

He was author of a compendium of medicine Kitab al-mu'alaja al-buqratiya (Hippocratic treatments), in ten books. It is extant only in Arabic language. Tabari has written valuable articles on different medical sciences; however, he is especially famous for authoring the al-Mu'alajat al-Buqratiya (Hippocratic Treatments) - an important medical encyclopedia. Several of Al-Tabari's succeeding scholars and physician have referred to the al-Mu'alajat al-Buqratiya in their medical articles. The aim of this study is further introduction of this great physician and assessment of his theories and key works.

== Sources ==
- F. Wüstenfeld, Arabschen Aerzte (56, 1840).

== See also ==
- Medicine in the medieval Islamic world
- List of Iranian scientists
