= Mohammad Zohari =

Iranian writer and poet (1926–1995)

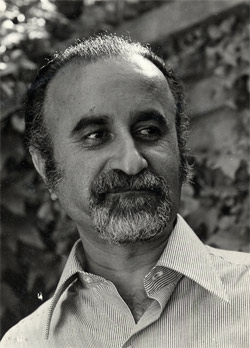
Mohammad Zohari

Mohammad Zohari (Persian: محمد زهری; 1926–1995) was an Iranian poet and writer.

== Biography ==
Born in Tonekabon, he was the first son of Abdollah Khaan Zohari Khalatbari, an activist in the Iranian Constitutional Revolution who had received the honorific title of "Motamed-ol-Soltan Zaigham-ol-Mamalek" from Ahmad Shah Qajar. In 1931, due to his father's disagreement with Reza Shah Pahlavi, the family was exiled to Malayer, and later to Shiraz. There he started his writing career in his early teenage years by writing articles and short stories for Toffan Magazine. After the end of the Second World War, the family returned to Tehran. There, Zohari studied Persian literature at Tehran University, and later achieved a PhD in literature from the same university. After graduation, Zohari worked as high school and university teacher, and as a journalist for Ferdowsi Magazine, Fokahi and some others for some years before he became a government employee and worked in various positions such as head of media and PR for the Ministry of Education and vice-director of the National Library of Iran.

In his work, Zohari found inspiration in all his surroundings, and most of his poems were about his social environment or love, however the most published one was about the country's social circumstances. In 1953, he met Nima Yooshij for the first time, which resulted in many more visits in the following years, to discuss poetry and modern literature that many believe influenced Zohari's work and modern poetry in Iran.

In 1977, Zohari travelled to Paris and stayed until 1979, when he returned to Iran, however due to some of his socialistic thought in 1982, three years after the Iranian Revolution, he was again forced to leave Iran and moved to Paris. The experience to leave his home by force for the second time, once when he was a child and once as an adult, was very difficult for Zohari, and made he decide he would not write anymore. Due to his great love for Iran, Zohari returned to Tehran in 1992, but during some legal straggling he died of a heart attack in 1995.

== Published poetry collections ==
- The Island, (1955) Amirkabir (publisher)
- The Complaint, (1966) Publisher: Ashrafe
- Nocturnal Letter, (شبنامه) (1968) Publisher: Ashrafe
- And the End, (1969)
- Fist in the Pocket, (1972) Publisher: Ashrafe
- Our Old Sage Said, (1977) Publisher: Ravag
- For every star (برای هر ستاره), (2000) Publisher: Toos
  - A short biography and collection of some unpublished Zohari’s work, collected by his wife Mandana Bavandi Zohari, edited by Bahman Hamidi and published by Mohsen Bagherzadeh. The title of book was suggested by Dr Shafiei Kadkani and the cover were designed by Ali Zaym.

== See also ==
- Intellectual movements in Iran

== Sources ==
- Zohari, Mohammad (2000). For every star. Tehran: Toos Publishers. pp. 11–13. ISBN 964-315-578-1.
- Yosefinia, Ali Asghar (1989). The History of Tonekabon. Tehran, Iran: Diba/Ghatreh Publications.
- Khalatbari, Pejman. History and Genealogy of Khalatbari Family. Tehran, Iran. ISBN 978-964-04-6098-6.
