= Homayoun Khorram =

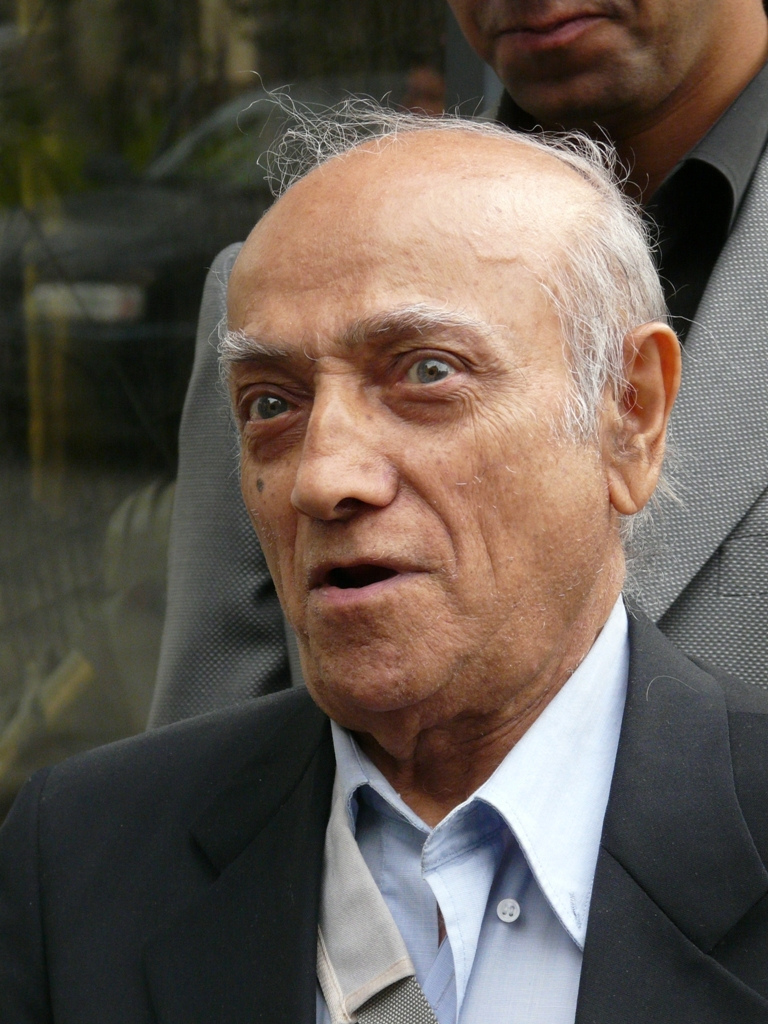

Background information
- Born: June 30, 1930
- Origin: Bushehr, Iran
- Died: January 17, 2013 (aged 82)
- Genres: Persian traditional music
- Occupations: Musician, violinist, composer
- Instrument: Violin
- Website: homayounkhorram.com

Ostad Homayoun Khorram (Persian: همایون خرم), (June 30, 1930 – January 17, 2013) was an Iranian musician, composer, violinist, and a member of the high council of Iran's house of music.

Khorram began his music career as a violinist at the age of 10 by participating in master Abolhassan Saba violin and Radif classes. After four years of lessons, Khorram entered the State National Radio Orchestra as a violin soloist and afterwards as a concert maestro. Due to the genius musical talent and passion he start to work as a leading composer of the National Radio at the age of 21.

At the same time with music education, he followed up academic education and acquired MSc degree in electrical engineering. On one occasion, Khorram commented that he found music and engineering complementary rather than contradictory, both having roots in mathematics.

During his career specially as soloist and composer in the famous radio musical program Golha Khorram composed many songs for notable singers including Hossein Ghavami (Fakhteh), Marzieh, Hayedeh, Shajarian and made over a hundreds of instrumental pieces for violin and orchestra, charmezrabs, overtures in collaboration with outstanding contemporary artists including Javad Maroufi, Jalil Shahnaz, and Farhang Sharif. In recent years, he worked with such young talented singers as Mohammad Esfahani and Alireza Ghorbani. He was also responsible for helping to bring the famous Iranian singer Moein onto the stage.

== Works ==
- Ghoghaye Setaregan
- ...

== Copyright ==
Reza Khoram (son of Homayoun Khoram) published a letter of protest from the news agencies alleging that the rights of Homayoun Khoram's works were not respected, in which he and his family protested against the theft of his father's works by some musicians. The letter states:

"Dear friends, every work of music has a creator and owner, an author whose rights are due to him or his inheritance. If this music is mixed with words, two people have this joint work, a composer and a songwriter.

Unfortunately, recently it has been seen many times that the works of my father "Homayoun Khoram" have been read by men and women without notice and permission. In many cases, the performances are very poor, the settings are inappropriate, the orchestration is unfavorable, the original composition of the song is awkwardly changed, the introduction and answers of the orchestra are removed or shortened, personal tastes are applied, and so on.

Note that, first of all, all the rights of these works in terms of music and song belong to our family. Secondly, I am a trustworthy servant, responsible and lawyer of some songwriters or their heirs. Dear ones, be honest. Therefore, after this date, serious and legal and without compliments, art thieves who abuse these works in any way, including cyberspace, concert performances, publishing audio or video CDs, notation in book form, etc., will be severely dealt with. will be .

Works that have been published so far without permission must be submitted before my action."

== Publications ==
Several books have been published by, or on behalf of, Khorram:

- Navaye Mehr (1) written with the efforts of Mr. Babak Shahraki.
- Navaye Mehr (2) written with the efforts of Mr. Mohammad reza Torabian.
- Ghoghaye Setaregan written with the efforts of Mr. Ali Vakili علی وکیلی.
- Chahar Magham (چهارمقام) is written by Dr. Mohsen Kazemian ( دکتر محسن کاظمیان). this book is the newest book which is published about Homayoun Khorram, and included the new proposed techniques and theory which are offered by the author.
