= Iraj (singer) =

Iranian singer (1933–2026)

Iraj ایرج
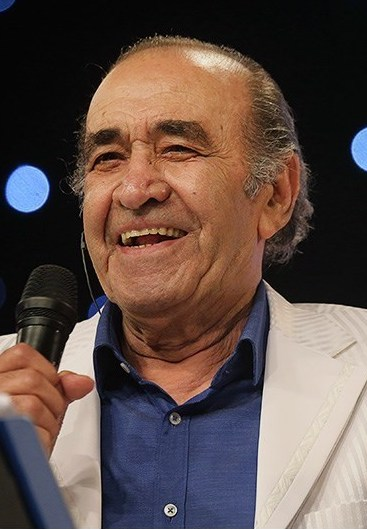
- Iraj in 2016

Background information
- Born: Hossein Khajeh Amiri Khaledi; 1 January 1933; Natanz, Imperial State of Iran
- Died: 12 August 2026 (aged 93) Tehran, Iran
- Genre: Traditional Persian music
- Occupations: Singer, songwriter
- Years active: 1949–2025
- Labels: Taraneh; Caltex; Avang Records/Avang; MZM Records
- Website: Iraj on Instagram www.irajkhajeamiri.com

Hossein Khajeh Amiri (Persian: حسین خواجه‌ امیری), more commonly known as Iraj (Persian: ایرج; 1 January 1933 – 12 August 2026), was an Iranian singer.

== Life and career ==
Hossein Khajeh Amiri was born on 1 January 1933. His children are pop singer Ehsan Khajeh Amiri and music teacher and producer Elika Khajeh Amiri.

He owned Avaye iraj, a music school in Tehran named after him.

Iraj died in Tehran on 12 August 2026, at the age of 93.
