= Javad Maroufi =

Javād Ma'roufi جواد معـروفی

Background information
- Born: 1912; Tehran, Iran
- Died: December 1993 (aged 80–81); Tehran, Iran
- Genres: Persian classical
- Occupation(s): Composer, pianist
- Instrument: Piano

Javād Ma'roufi (Persian: جواد معروفی), (1912 in Tehran – December 7, 1993, in Tehran) was an Iranian composer and pianist.

== Biography ==
Javād Ma'roufi was born in Tehran to the musician father Musā Ma'roufi and mother Ozrā Ma'roufi (or Ezra Ma'roufi) who were both distinguished pupils of Darvish Khan, a renowned music master of the time in Iran. Javād Ma'roufi lost his mother at a young age, and consequently grew up with his paternal family. He was taught in music first by his father, playing both the tar and the violin. At age fourteen, he attended the Academy of Music of which Ali-Naqi Vaziri was the director and where he studied the piano under the music master Tatiana Kharatian. During this period he studied works by Chopin, Mozart, Beethoven and Bach.

His more well-known compositions include "Jila Fantasy", "Golden dreams", and "Ashura".

== Death ==
Ma'roufi died in the morning of Tuesday 7 December 1993 (16 Āzar 1372 AH) in a hospital in Tehran.
