= Delkash =

Iranian musical artist (1925–2004)

Delkash دلکش
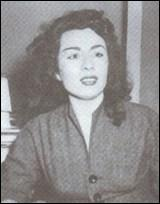

Background information
- Also known as: Delkash
- Born: Esmat Bagherpour Baboli; 26 February 1925; Babol, Iran
- Origin: Mazandaran and Tehran
- Died: 1 September 2004 (aged 79) Tehran, Iran
- Genres: Persian classical Folk; Classical
- Occupations: Singer, actress
- Years active: 1943–1979
- Labels: Caltex Records; Avang Records; Pars Video; Taraneh Records

Esmat Bagherpour Baboli (Persian: عصمت باقرپور بابلی [ʔesmæt bɒːɣeɾpuːɾ bɒːboliː]; 22 February 1925 – 1 September 2004), better known as Delkash (دلکش, [delkæʃ]), was an Iranian diva singer and occasional actress with a rare and unique voice.

== Biography ==
Delkash was born in Babol, Iran and was the daughter of a cotton trader who had nine other children. She came to Tehran to study (where she stayed until her death in 2004), but she was discovered soon and was introduced to the music masters of the time, Ruhollah Khaleghi and Abdolali Vaziri. She was named Delkash by Khaleghi.

Delkash started public singing in 1943 and was employed in Radio Iran in 1945, only five years after the establishment of the program. There, she worked with composer Mehdi Khaledi for seven years, until 1952. The best of her songs were written by Rahim Moeini Kermanshahi, Iranian lyricist, and Ali Tajvidi, Iranian composer, from 1954 until 1969. Besides Persian, Delkash sang several songs, such as Kija and Banu, in her native Mazandarani language.

She also worked as a songwriter under the pen name of Niloofar (Persian: نیلوفر) and played in a few Iranian movies, including Sharmsaar, Maadar, Farda Roushan Ast, Afsoungar, and Dasiseh. She worked with singer and electric guitar musician Vigen Derderian Sultan of Jazz. Their duet "Delam Mikhast" can be heard on YouTube. Delkash died in September 2004, at the age of 79, in Tehran and was buried in Emamzadeh Taher, a popular graveyard for artists located in Karaj.
