= Golha (radio programmes) =

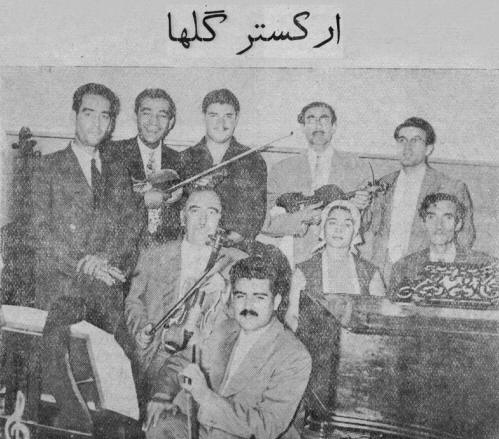
- Singers at the Golha Studio in 1957
- Also known as: Golhaye Rangarang
- Genre: Persian music; Persian poetry
- Country of origin: Iran
- Original language: Persian
- No. of episodes: 1,578

Production
- Production company: Radio Tehran

Original release
- Network: NIRT (1956–1979)
- Release: 1956 – 11 February 1979

The Golha (Persian: گلها, romanized: Flowers), also known as Golhaye Rangarang (Persian: گلهای رنگارنگ, lit. 'Colorful Flowers'), is a television programme and radio broadcast which broadcast on NIRT and radio station Radio Tehran, active from 1956 to 1979. The history of the broadcast is supported by The Golha Project. There were 1,578 programs, consisting of approximately 847 hours of music and poetry. Additionally they were covered in the Journal of Persianate Studies in 2008.

== History ==
The "Golha" radio programs, initiated by Davoud Pirnia, began with the name "Eternal Flowers" on Radio Tehran, where he served as both the founder and director. These programs were made up of literary commentary with the declamation of poetry, sung with musical accompaniment, and interspersed with solo musical pieces. Other programs were later added to this series with a slightly different emphasis on content, including "Colorful Flowers," "A Branch of Flowers," "Green Leaf," and "Desert Flowers" after 1955. During Pirnia's eleven-year tenure overseeing the production of the "Golha" series, five categories of programs were produced: "Eternal Flowers" (157 programs); "Colorful Flowers" (481 programs); "Green Leaf" (481 programs); "A Branch of Flowers" (465 programs); and "Desert Flowers" (64 programs). Each of these series included selected works of ancient and contemporary Persian poets. Additionally, traditional Iranian music was prominently featured in these series. After Pirnia retired from radio activity in 1967 and after several years of instability, another program called "Fresh Flowers" was broadcast in 1972 under the direction of Houshang Ebtehaj.

The programs were considered exemplars of excellence in the sphere of music and refined examples of literary expression, making use of a repertoire of over 250 classical and modern Persian poets, setting literary and musical standards that are supposedley still looked up to with admiration in Iran today and referred to by scholars and musicians as an encyclopaedia of Persian music and Persian poetry.

They marked a watershed in Persian culture, following which music and musicians gained respectability. Heretofore, music had been practiced behind closed doors. When performed in public spaces, the performers had been tarred with the same brush as popular street minstrels.

Until the advent of these programs, it had been taken for granted that any female performers and musicians were less than respectable. Due to the high literary and musical quality of these programs, public perception of music and musicians in Iran shifted, its participants came to be considered-virtually for the first time in Persian history of the Islamic period—as maestros, virtuosos, divas and adepts of a fine art, and no longer looked down upon as cabaret singers or denigrated as street minstrels.

=== End and legacy ===
The Golha programs were broadcast on a government-owned radio station, and they all came to an end with the arrival of the Iranian Revolution in 1979. During the early post-1979 years, music and song were considered counter-revolutionary and frowned upon. Many of the Golha artists permanently emigrated from Iran and many who remained ceased performing in public for a number of years.

Female singers had been among the stars of the Radio Golha programs. The revolutionaries outlawed female solo singing. Women were free to continue to play musical instruments, and to sing in choruses, and to sing a solo in front of all-female audiences, but the recording of female solo singing was banned. This was a significant and unfortunate departure from the spirit of Radio Golha.

Homayoun Khorram, a violinist who was one of the Golha musicians, commented 25 years after the close of the show: "The Golha programs should be considered to be a veritable audio treasury of the history of traditional Persian Music. Considering the incredible efforts that went into producing these programs and their strong influence on society, they are still considered today to be the best resource for our music. It is very appropriate and important that these programs be preserved and passed on to future generations."

Jane Lewisohn, a researcher in the music department at the University of London (SOAS) conducted archival research work on Golha starting in 2005, which helped form, The Golha Project. Other organizations supporting The Golha Project include the School of Oriental and African Studies at SOAS, the British Institute of Iranian Studies, the Iranian Heritage Organization in London, and the British Library.
