= Akbar Golpayegani =

Iranian singer (1934–2023)

- اکبر_گلپایگانی
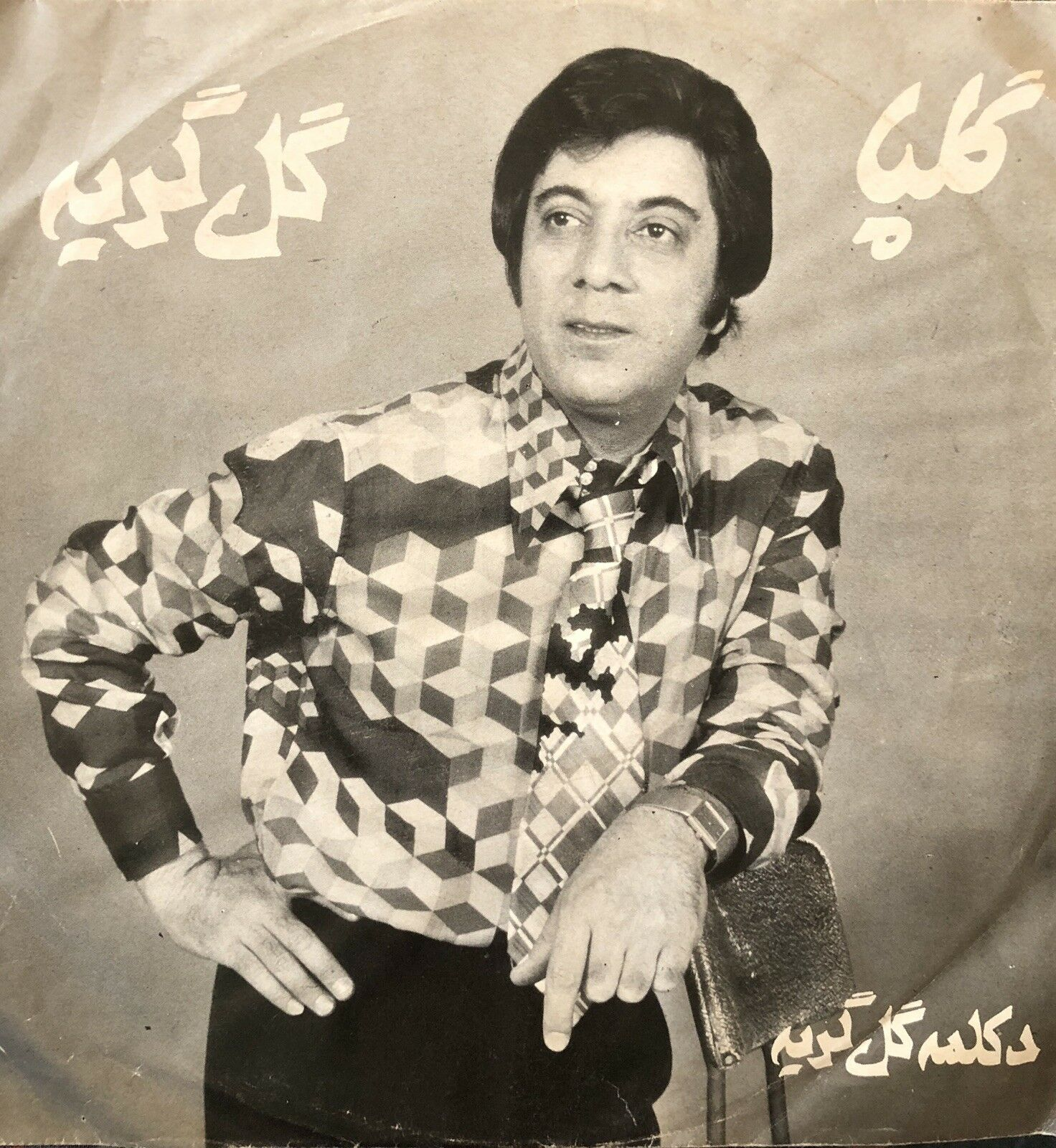
- Born: 30 January 1934; Tehran, Iran
- Died: 4 November 2023 (aged 89); Tehran, Iran
- Other names: Golpa
- Occupation: Singer

Akbar Golpayegani (Persian: اکبر_گلپایگانی; 30 January 1934 – 4 November 2023), also known as Golpa (Persian: گلپا), was an Iranian traditional singer.

== Life and career ==
Born in Tehran, Golpayegani started his musical training in 1951. At 14 he had his first experience in a choir, and at 15 he became a member of the Nizam School Music Association.

Golpayegani had his breakout in 1956, when he began participating in the National Iranian Radio musical show Radio Golha, on which he collaborated until 1979. He was the first Iranian singer to perform abroad, taking part in a 1956 international festival promoted by Unesco. In 1969, his performance of "Poem of Saadi" was included in the soundtrack of Pier Paolo Pasolini's film Medea. In 1984, he was awarded an honorary doctorate from the University of Tehran.

Golpayegani died on 4 November 2023, at the age of 89. He was buried in the artists' wing of the Behesht-e Zahra cemetery.
