= Gholam-Hossein Banan =

Iranian singer (1911–1986)

Gholam-Hossein Banan غلامحسین بنان
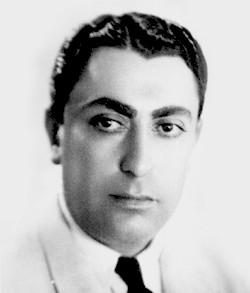

Background information
- Also known as: Banan
- Born: 5 May 1911; Tehran, Iran
- Died: 27 February 1986 (aged 74) Tehran, Iran
- Genres: Classical; traditional
- Occupation: Singer
- Years active: 1943–1979
- Labels: Taraneh; Apolon; Caltex; Avang

Gholām-Hossein Banān (Persian: غلامحسين بنان; 5 May 1911 – 27 February 1986) was an Iranian musician and singer. One of the most prominent Iranian singers of the 20th century, he was renowned for the quality of his voice.

== Biography ==
Born in Tehran, Banān descended from a prominent family "with a background in government service". His father, Karim Khan Banān ol-Dowleh (son of Mohammad-Taqi Mirza Fazlollah Khan Mostowfi Nuri) was an admirer of traditional music. His mother was related to the ruling Qajar dynasty of Iran; she was the daughter of Mohammad Taqi Mirza Rokn ed-Dowleh, a brother of Naser al-Din Shah Qajar (r. 1848–1896). Margaret Caton notes that Banān grew up in an environment where artistic development was fostered; his father sang and played the tar, while his mother played piano. Banān's maternal aunt played the ney, and his sisters studied the tar with Morteza Neidavoud.

From the age of six Gholam-Hossein Banān began to take lessons in singing and playing the piano and organ through the encouragement of Morteza Neidavoud who was quick to recognize him as musically talented. Gholām-Hossein's first teachers were his parents. He subsequently studied with Mirzā Tāher Ziā oz-Zākerin Rasā'í and Nāser Seif. Ali-Naqi Vaziri later introduced him to the acclaimed Rouhollah Khāleghi.

Banān joined the Iranian National Music Association in 1942, and appeared on Iranian National Radio that same year. He then joined the orchestra of the distinguished pianist Javād Maroufi, becoming the lead vocalist.

In 1957 or 1958, Banān became blind in his right eye following a car accident.

Banān died 7:00 pm on Thursday 27 February 1986 in Iranmehr Hospital in Gholhak, Tehran. He is still remembered by lovers of traditional Persian music. Among his best-remembered songs are "Ey Iran", "Caravan", "Elahe-ye Naz", and “Ro’yaye Hasti”.

== Sources ==
- Caton, M. (1988). "BANĀN, ḠOLĀM-ḤOSAYN". Encyclopaedia Iranica.
