= Mehrdad Asemani =

Iranian singer and composer

- مهرداد آسمانی
- Born: Mehrdad Akhavan; July 16, 1967 (age 59); Tehran, Iran
- Other name: Mehrdad
- Citizenship: United States
- Occupations: Singer; composer
- Years active: 1989–present
- Musical career
- Labels: Taraneh, Caltex, Avang
- Website: http://www.mehrdadasemani.com/

Mehrdad Akhavan (Persian: مهرداد اخوان), better known by his stage name Mehrdad Asemani (مهرداد آسمانی), was born on July 16, 1967, in Tehran, Iran. He is an Iranian singer, composer, and musician living in Los Angeles.

== Early life and career ==
Akhavan was born in Tehran and spent his childhood in Hafez Street (Sanglej). He went to Hadaf Junior High and graduated from Hadaf High School. Despite being accepted to university, he enlisted for military service and served for 27 months in the Iran-Iraq War. While attending school, he learned music and singing techniques from masters in these fields in Iran.

When he realized he could not freely pursue his singing career in Iran, he left Iran in 1992 for Los Angeles. While in Los Angeles, Akhavan released his first album, Voice of Sun, becoming famous in the Persian community worldwide. With his second album called Pooste Shab, he became a household name in the Persian community.

Akhavan has written many songs for other famous Persian singers living in California; many of them are about Iran. In his album Ghazal, Akhavan sings "Mahak" for his child, Mehrzad.

Akhavan collaborated with Persian Diva Googoosh to work on her album Q, Q Bang Bang.

== Leaving Iran ==
In addition to his primary studies, Akhavan studied music with art professors. After performing several songs for Iranian radio and television, he decided to work independently.

Akhavan first achieved fame with the album Night Skin and the famous song "Chador" (Chador Nandaz Saret), with lyrics by Masoud Amini and composing by Hassan Shamaeizadeh. Mohammad Saleh Ala and Amini composed the songs performed in their first albums. After releasing these two albums and performing a concert in Los Angeles, Akhavan held concerts in different cities in America and Europe in 1999. He married Ghazaleh in 2000 and had two sons, Mehrzad and Mahan. The couple separated in 2010. In 2019, Akhavan married Shiva Rahimi and had a son named Milan.

== Artistic activity ==
=== Composing for other singers ===
Akhavan worked with Googoosh, Shohreh Solati, Nooshafarin, Sattar, Mahasti, Shahram Shabpareh, Leila Forouhar, Shahram Solati, Delaram, Behzad, Farrokh Turkzadeh, Nahid, Sheila, Susan Roshan, Mansour, Fataneh, Saman, and Arman.

Akhavan has collaborated with famous songwriters such as Iraj Janati Ataie, Masoud Amini, Mohammad Saleh Ala, Shahyar Ghanbari, Homayoun Houshiarnejad, Masoud Fardmanesh, Zoya Zakarian, and Jacqueline, and with composers such as Jahanbakhsh Pazooki, Siavash Ghomayshi, Hassan Shamaeizadeh, Manouchehr Cheshmazar, and Babak Bayat.

=== Collaboration with Googoosh ===
Akhavan's first collaboration with Googoosh was Q, Q Bang Bang, with a poem by Zoya Zakarian. It was arranged by Manouchehr Cheshmazar, and its total runtime was about 13 minutes long. This collaboration continued in the album Last News in 2003. Akhavan composed all the songs in this album (except "Pir Mashrekh"). The songs of this album were written by Shahyar Ghanbari and Zakarian, with arrangements by Akhavan, Andy J, and Manouchehr Cheshmazar, who performed the song Last News in two voices in this album. Googoosh appeared as a guest singer in Akhavan's snapshot album and performed three songs with Akhavan in two voices. Subsequently, Akhavan appeared in the next album of Googoosh, Akhavan's Manifest, as a composer and arranger with songs by Shahyar Ghanbari. He also performed the song of birth certificate in two voices with Googoosh; in 2008, after three years of silence, they jointly released the album Shab Speid.

=== Collaboration with Shohreh Solati ===
Most of Akhavan's songs (after Googoosh) were performed by Shohreh Solati, including 14 songs, four of which are unreleased. One song, "Payam", had lyrics written by Masoud Fardmanesh and arranged by Manouchehr Cheshmazar. The song "Naamee", with music by Masoud Fardmanesh, was arranged by Amir Badakhsh. Akhavan was a singer of the two-voice song. Akhavan's collaboration with Shohreh was not limited to composing and singing; the two went around the world together to perform a tour in Europe and America.

=== Cooperation with Sattar and Mahasti ===
This collaboration was titled Gol Gandam, produced jointly with Sattar and Mahasti. Akhavan wrote the lyrics of all the songs in this album, as well as Alireza Meibodi, Homayoun Hoshiar Nejad, and Masoud Amini; Gol Gandam was arranged by Manouchehr Cheshmazar, Schubert. Avakian and Saeed Ghorbani, published in 1998, had Mahasti and Sattar perform a two-part song called "Booye Noon, Booye Khak, and Booye Gandom".

== Discography ==
=== The Voice of the Sun ===
This album was recorded underground in Iran and released in Los Angeles.

Sedaye Khorshid album, Taraneh Records, 1994
Name	Songwriter	Composer	Arrangement
"Lisanse"	Mohammad Saleh Ala	Mehrdad Asemani	Ara Hairapatian
"Sag (Dog)"	Mohammad Saleh Ala	Mehrdad Asemani	Saeed Shahram
"Mash Taghi"	Mohammad Saleh Ala	Mehrdad Asemani	Parviz Rahman Panah
"Zolfe Siah"	Mohammad Saleh Ala	Mehrdad Asemani	Saeed Shahram
"Yadegari"	Mohammad Saleh Ala	Mehrdad Asemani	Saeed Shahram
"Oun Rooza"	Mohammad Saleh Ala	Mehrdad Asemani	Saeed Shahram
"Khanomi"	Alireza Meybodi	Mehrdad Asemani	Manouchehr Cheshmazar
"Aftab (Sun)"	Mohammad Saleh Ala	Mehrdad Asemani	Ara Hairapatian

=== Night Skin ===
Pooste Shab album, Taraneh Records, 1995
Name	Songwriter	Composer	Arrangement
"Chador"	Masoud Amini	Hassan Shamaizadeh	Mahdad Zand Karimi
"Pooste Shab"	Masoud Amini	Mohammad Heydari	Manouchehr Cheshmazar
"Eyde Ghorbat"	Mohammad Saleh Ala	Mehrdad Asemani	Manouchehr Cheshmazar
"Baghe Atlasi"	Mohammad Saleh Ala	Mehrdad Asemani	Ara Hairapatian
"Safare Eshgh"	Mohammad Saleh Ala	Mehrdad Asemani	Manouchehr Cheshmazar
"Shabestoune Cheshat"	Mohammad Saleh Ala	Mehrdad Asemani	Brian Wayy
"Aman Aman"	Aref Ghazvini	Old Melody	Manouchehr Cheshmazar
"Mashine Abpash"	Masoud Amini	Mehrdad Asemani	Manouchehr Cheshmazar

=== Antique ===
Antique album, Taraneh Records, 1996
Name	Songwriter	Composer	Arrangement
"Antique"	Masoud Amini	Mohammad Heydari	Manouchehr Cheshmazar
"Nazanin"	Homayoon Houshiarnejad	Mehrdad Asemani	Abdi Yamini
"Khooneh"	Alireza Meybodi	Mehrdad Asemani	Schubert Avakian
"Hanoozam Tou"	Shahyar Ghanbari	Siavash Ghomayshi	Andranik Asatourian
"Niloufare Abi"	Mohammad Saleh Ala	Mehrdad Asemani	Manouchehr Cheshmazar
"Daryayee"	Mohammad Saleh Ala	Siavash Ghomayshi	Schubert Avakian
"Galoobandak"	Mohammad Saleh Ala	Mehrdad Asemani	Brian Wayy

=== Khatoon ===
Khatoon album, Taraneh Records, 1997
Name	Songwriter	Composer	Arrangement
"Khatoon"	Homayoon Houshiarnejad	Mehrdad Asemani	Schubert Avakian
"Hormate Mehmoon"	Homayoon Houshiarnejad	Mehrdad Asemani	Schubert Avakian
"Hala Bia"	Mohammad Saleh Ala	Mehrdad Asemani	Schubert Avakian
"Ashegh Shodan"	Jahanbakhsh Pazooki	Jahanbakhsh Pazooki	Manouchehr Cheshmazar
"Envare Donya"	Homayoon Houshiarnejad	Old Melody	Elton Ahi
"Aroose Kaghazi"	Mohammad Saleh Ala	Mehrdad Asemani	Schubert Avakian
"Hasha Makon"	Mohammad Saleh Ala	Mehrdad Asemani	Manouchehr Cheshmazar
"Hamvatan"	Mohammad Saleh Ala	Mehrdad Asemani	Manouchehr Cheshmazar

=== Aroosak ===
Aroosak album, Taraneh Records, 1998-1999
Name	Songwriter	Composer	Arrangement
"Aroosak"	Masoud Fardmanesh	Mehrdad Asemani	Manouchehr Cheshmazar
"Khanomak"	Homayoon Houshiarnejad	Manouchehr Cheshmazar	Manouchehr Cheshmazar
"Ghesmat"	Homayoon Houshiarnejad	Mehrdad Asemani	Manouchehr Cheshmazar
"Nefreen"	Mohammad Saleh Ala	Mehrdad Asemani	Manouchehr Cheshmazar
"Yade Tou"	Homayoon Houshiarnejad	Mehrdad Asemani	Manouchehr Cheshmazar
"Pashin Pashin"	Homayoon Houshiarnejad	Mehrdad Asemani	Schubert Avakian
"Eshgh Hameh Kareh Ast"	Masoud Fardmanesh	Mehrdad Asemani	Manouchehr Cheshmazar
"Del Del"	Homayoon Houshiarnejad	Mehrdad Asemani	Schubert Avakian

=== Barge Gol (Petal) ===
Barge Gol (Petal) album, Caltex Records, 2000
Name	Songwriter	Composer	Arrangement
"Vatan"	Masoud Amini	Mehrdad Asemani	Saeid Ghorbani
"Jonoobiha"	Masoud Amini	Mehrdad Asemani	Schubert Avakian
"Barge Gol (Petal)"	Masoud Amini	Mehrdad Asemani	Amir Badakhsh
"Aziz Dordooneh"	Masoud Fardmanesh	Mehrdad Asemani	Amir Badakhsh
"Gol"	Masoud Fardmanesh	Mehrdad Asemani	Kazem Alemi
"Maryam"	Homayoon Houshiarnejad	Mehrdad Asemani	Schubert Avakian
"Khejalat"	Masoud Amini	Mehrdad Asemani	Schubert Avakian
"Ghalbe Pareh Pareh"	Homayoon Houshiarnejad	Mehrdad Asemani	Kazem Alemi

=== Ghazal ===
Ghazal album, Caltex Records, 2001-2002
Name	Songwriter	Composer	Arrangement
"Mehrabooni Kon Naro"	Masoud Amini	Mehrdad Asemani	Manouchehr Cheshmazar
"Ghazal"	Homayoon Houshiarnejad	Mehrdad Asemani	Mohammad Sattari
"Aroosiye Irani"	Jaklin Derderian	Mehrdad Asemani	Amir Badakhsh
"Baba Karam (1)"	Mohammad Saleh Ala	Mehrdad Asemani	Amir Badakhsh
"Mahe Man"	Jaklin Derderian	Jaklin Derderian	Kazem Alemi
"Takhte Jamshid"	Maryam Heydarzadeh	Mehrdad Asemani	Brian Wayy
"Baba Karam (2)"	Mohammad Saleh Ala	Mehrdad Asemani	Mohammad Sattari
"Dokhtare Kordi"	Jaklin Derderian	Mehrdad Asemani	Brian Wayy

=== Magic of Love ===
Magic of Love album, Caltex Records, 2003
Name	Songwriter	Composer	Arrangement
"Maahak"	Zoya Zakarian	Mehrdad Asemani	Manouchehr Cheshmazar
"Jadooye Eshgh"	Zoya Zakarian	Mehrdad Asemani	Mohammad Sattari
"Faseleh"	Zoya Zakarian	Mehrdad Asemani	Manouchehr Cheshmazar
"Naneh Baroon"	Zoya Zakarian	Mehrdad Asemani	Amir Badakhsh
"Yaare Gol"	Zoya Zakarian	Mehrdad Asemani	Mohammad Sattari
"Daste Man Nist"	Zoya Zakarian	Mehrdad Asemani	Manouchehr Cheshmazar
"Shatranj"	Zoya Zakarian	Mehrdad Asemani	Manouchehr Cheshmazar
"Gahvarehe Siavash"	Zoya Zakarian	Mehrdad Asemani	Amir Badakhsh

=== Akse Fori (Snapshot) ===
Akse Fori (Snapshot) album, Caltex Records, 2004
Name	Songwriter	Composer	Arrangement
"Divare Yaar"	Shahyar Ghanbari	Mehrdad Asemani	Mehrdad Asemani
"Akse Fori"	Shahyar Ghanbari	Mehrdad Asemani	Mehrdad Asemani
"Nasle Maa" (feat. Googoosh)	Shahyar Ghanbari	Mehrdad Asemani	Mehrdad Asemani
"Yek Tekeh Noor"	Shahyar Ghanbari	Mehrdad Asemani	Mehrdad Asemani
"Harighe Shahre Gheseh" (feat. Googoosh)	Shahyar Ghanbari	Mehrdad Asemani	Mehrdad Asemani
"Saro Tahe Navar" (feat. Googoosh)	Shahyar Ghanbari	Parviz Atabaki	Mehrdad Asemani
"Kardasty"	Shahyar Ghanbari	Mehrdad Asemani	Mehrdad Asemani
"Raghse Bee Ejazeh"	Shahyar Ghanbari	Mehrdad Asemani	Mehrdad Asemani

=== Shabe Sepid ===
- With Googoosh

Shabe Sepid album, MZM Records, 2008
Name	Songwriter	Composer	Arrangement
"Jangale Shesho Hasht"	Shahyar Ghanbari	Mehrdad Asemani	Andy G
"Boosehaye Piadeh Ro"	Shahyar Ghanbari	Mehrdad Asemani	Andy G
"Hafteye Sepido Siah"	Shahyar Ghanbari	Mehrdad Asemani	Andy G
"Koocheye Lokht"	Shahyar Ghanbari	Mehrdad Asemani	Andy G
"Niloofare Abi Medley"	Masoud Fardmanesh, Mohammad Saleh Ala, Zoya Zakarian	Mehrdad Asemani	Andy G

=== Taste of Dreams ===
Taste of Dreams album, Taraneh Records, 2010-2011
Name	Songwriter	Composer	Arrangement
"Taraneh Hamo Pas Bedeh"	Iraj Janatie Ataie	Mehrdad Asemani	Ali Elahi
"Festivale Gol"	Iraj Janatie Ataie	Mehrdad Asemani	Ali Elahi
"Maah Baanoo"	Iraj Janatie Ataie	Mehrdad Asemani	Ali Elahi
"Tamaame Ma"	Iraj Janatie Ataie	Mehrdad Asemani	Ali Elahi
"Maalikhooliyaa"	Iraj Janatie Ataie	Mehrdad Asemani	Ali Elahi
"Aatish Baazi"	Iraj Janatie Ataie	Mehrdad Asemani	Ali Elahi

=== Shabihe Hichkas ===
Shabihe Hichkas album, Avang Music, 2012-2013
Name	Songwriter	Composer	Arrangement
"Shabihe Hichkas"	Iraj Janatie Ataie	Mehrdad Asemani	Manouchehr Cheshmazar
"Beine Do Geryeh"	Iraj Janatie Ataie	Mehrdad Asemani	Manouchehr Cheshmazar
"Rythme Vasvaseh"	Iraj Janatie Ataie	Mehrdad Asemani	Manouchehr Cheshmazar
"Nemibakhsham"	Iraj Janatie Ataie	Mehrdad Asemani	Manouchehr Cheshmazar
"Be Saa‐Atet Negah Kon"	Iraj Janatie Ataie	Mehrdad Asemani	Manouchehr Cheshmazar
"Zedde Nour"	Iraj Janatie Ataie	Mehrdad Asemani	Manouchehr Cheshmazar

=== Nabze Gol ===
Nabz Gol album, Avang Music, 2015
Name	Songwriter	Composer	Arrangement
"Nabze Gol"	Shahyar Ghanbari	Mehrdad Asemani	Argamo Toros
"Konje Mahtab"	Sina Izadbin	Mehrdad Asemani	Hamed Shams
"Negam Kon"	Sina Izadbin	Mehrdad Asemani	Mehdi Ebrahimi
"Dastamo Begir"	Sina Izadbin	Mehrdad Asemani	Hamed Shams
"Mahtabe Varooneh"	Sina Izadbin	Mehrdad Asemani	Nima Nour-Mohammadi
"Nafas Banou"	Sina Izadbin	Mehrdad Asemani	Mehdi Ebrahimi
"Bonbast"	Sina Izadbin	Mehrdad Asemani	Hamed Shams
"Rythme Azadi"	Sina Izadbin	Mehrdad Asemani	Argamo Toros
"Khanoumi (New Version)"	Alireza Meybodi	Mehrdad Asemani	Hamed Shams
"Eyde Ghorbat (New Version)"	Mohammad Saleh Ala	Mehrdad Asemani	Argamo Toros

=== Yare Shirin ===
Yare Shirin album, Asemani Music, 2017
Name	Songwriter	Composer	Arrangement
"Yare Shirin"	Sina Izadbin	Mehrdad Asemani	Meraj Mirzaei
"Aghoushe To"	Yalda Hashemipour	Mehrdad Asemani	Meraj Mirzaei
"Hala Chera"	Sina Izadbin	Mehrdad Asemani	Hamed Shams
"Invare Donya" (New Version) (feat. Asha)	Homayoon Houshiarnejad	Old Melody	Meraj Mirzaei
"Don't Cry My Love"	Jahanbakhsh Pazooki	Jahanbakhsh Pazooki	Manouchehr Cheshmazar
"Engar Na Engar"	Babak Radmanesh	Babak Radmanesh	-
"Iran"	Alireza Meybodi	Emad Raam	Amir Badakhsh
"Niyayesh"	Jahanbakhsh Pazooki	Mehrdad Asemani	Manouchehr Cheshmazar

=== Range Eshgh ===
Range Eshgh album, Asemani Music, 2018
Name	Songwriter	Composer	Arrangement
"Eshghe Zoleykhaie"	Sina Izadbin	Mehrdad Asemani	Meraj Mirzaei
"Mastane"	Rumi	Mehrdad Asemani	Meraj Mirzaei
"Javanane Vatan"	Aref Qazvini	Mehrdad Asemani, Aref Qazvini	Meraj Mirzaei
"Bahane"	Aref Qazvini	Aref Qazvini	Meraj Mirzaei
"Gerye"	Sina Izadbin	Mehrdad Asemani	Ali Hosseinzadeh
"Deltangi"	Sina Izadbin	Mehrdad Asemani	Ali Hosseinzadeh
"Dige Nemikhamet"	Sina Izadbin	Mehrdad Asemani	Ali Hosseinzadeh
"Sareban"	Saadi	Mehrdad Asemani	Meraj Mirzaei
"Tekrare Bihoode"	Sina Izadbin	Mehrdad Asemani	Meraj Mirzaei

== Composition for another singers ==
Singer	Song	Songwriter	Composer	Arrangement	Release date
Googoosh	"QQ Bang Bang"	Zoya Zakarian	Mehrdad Asemani	Manouchehr Cheshmazar	2003
Googoosh	"Otaghe Man"	Shahyar Ghanbari	Mehrdad Asemani	Andy G	2004
Googoosh	"Chelleh Neshin"	Shahyar Ghanbari	Mehrdad Asemani	Manouchehr Cheshmazar	2004
Googoosh / Mehrdad	"Akharin Khabar"	Shahyar Ghanbari	Mehrdad Asemani	Mehrdad Asemani	2004
Googoosh	"Ahooye Eshgh"	Zoya Zakarian	Mehrdad Asemani	Manouchehr Cheshmazar	2004
Googoosh	"Eyde Ashegh"	Zoya Zakarian	Mehrdad Asemani	Andy G	2004
Googoosh	"Baham"	Zoya Zakarian	Mehrdad Asemani	Andy G	2004
Googoosh	"Delkook"	Shahyar Ghanbari	Mehrdad Asemani	Manouchehr Cheshmazar	2004
Googoosh	"Ay Mardom"	Shahyar Ghanbari	Mehrdad Asemani	Mehrdad Asemani	2005
Googoosh	"Nejatam Bedeh"	Shahyar Ghanbari	Mehrdad Asemani	Mehrdad Asemani	2005
Googoosh	"Eshgh Yani Hamechiz"	Shahyar Ghanbari	Mehrdad Asemani	Mehrdad Asemani	2005
Googoosh	"Sangare Bi Panah"	Shahyar Ghanbari	Mehrdad Asemani	Mehrdad Asemani	2005
Googoosh	"Khoobe Khoob"	Shahyar Ghanbari	Mehrdad Asemani	Mehrdad Asemani	2005
Googoosh	"Ghazale Shisheei"	Shahyar Ghanbari	Mehrdad Asemani	Mehrdad Asemani	2005
Googoosh	"Aftabi"	Shahyar Ghanbari	Mehrdad Asemani	Mehrdad Asemani	2005
Googoosh / Mehrdad	"Shenasname-ye Man"	Shahyar Ghanbari	Mehrdad Asemani	Mehrdad Asemani	2005
Googoosh	"Shak Mikonam"	Shahyar Ghanbari	Mehrdad Asemani	Andy G	2008
Googoosh	"Shabe Sepid"	Shahyar Ghanbari	Mehrdad Asemani	Andy G	2008
Mahasti	"Mehman"	Alireza Meybodi	Mehrdad Asemani	Manouchehr Cheshmazar	2000
Mahasti	"Zanjire Eshgh"	Homayoon Houshiarnejad	Mehrdad Asemani	Saeid Ghorbani	2000
Mahasti	"Notehaye Jodaei"	Homayoon Houshiarnejad	Mehrdad Asemani	Manouchehr Cheshmazar	2000
Mahasti / Sattar	"Booye Noon o Booye Gandom"	Alireza Meybodi	Mehrdad Asemani	Manouchehr Cheshmazar	2000
Sattar	"Ahoo"	Masoud Amini	Mehrdad Asemani	Schubert Avakian	2000
Sattar	"Az To Che Moonde Baghi"	Alireza Meybodi	Mehrdad Asemani	Manouchehr Cheshmazar	2000
Sattar	"Joone Joonam"	Masoud Amini	Mehrdad Asemani	Manouchehr Cheshmazar	2000
Shahram Shabpareh	"Anare Doone Doone"	Shahram Shabpareh	Mehrdad Asemani	Manouchehr Cheshmazar	1998
Shahram Shabpareh	"Mah Az Koodom Var Omade"	Shahram Shabpareh	Mehrdad Asemani	Manouchehr Cheshmazar	1998
Shahram Shabpareh	"Asheghetam Hanooz"	Shahram Shabpareh	Mehrdad Asemani	Schubert Avakian	2001
Shahram Shabpareh	"Bigharar"	Mehrdad Asemani	Mehrdad Asemani	Schubert Avakian	2001
Shahram Solati	"Gol Khanoom"	Homayoon Houshiarnejad	Mehrdad Asemani	Schubert Avakian	1998
Shahram Solati	"Parvaz"	Masoud Fardmanesh	Mehrdad Asemani	Kazem Alemi	2000
Shahram Solati	"Jodayi"	Homayoon Houshiarnejad	Mehrdad Asemani	Schubert Avakian	2000
Shahram Solati	"Didi Saremoon Chi Oumad"	Masoud Amini	Mehrdad Asemani	Kazem Alemi	2000
Shahram Solati	"Delbar"	Homayoon Houshiarnejad	Mehrdad Asemani	Kazem Alemi	2000
Shahram Solati	"Be Dastham"	Masoud Amini	Mehrdad Asemani	Manouchehr Cheshmazar	2002
Shahram Solati	"Cheshmat"	Masoud Amini	Mehrdad Asemani	Kazem Alemi	2002
Shahram Solati	"Hichestan"	Masoud Fardmanesh	Mehrdad Asemani	Manouchehr Cheshmazar	2002
Shohreh	"Nasozi"	Homayoon Houshiarnejad	Mehrdad Asemani	Elton Farokh Ahi	1999
Shohreh	"Peyghoum"	Masoud Fardmanesh	Mehrdad Asemani	Manouchehr Cheshmazar	1999
Shohreh	"Harki Ashegheh"	Mohammad Saleh Ala	Mehrdad Asemani	Manouchehr Cheshmazar	1999
Shohreh	"Iran (Vatan)"	Masoud Amini	Mehrdad Asemani	Armen Aharonian	1999
Shohreh	"Pichak"	Paksima Zakipour	Mehrdad Asemani	Amir Badakhsh	1999
Shohreh	"Atre Zan"	Masoud Amini	Mehrdad Asemani	Manouchehr Cheshmazar	2001
Shohreh	"Daryab Mara"	Masoud Amini	Mehrdad Asemani	Manouchehr Cheshmazar	2001
Shohreh	"Naameh"	Masoud Fardmanesh	Mehrdad Asemani	Amir Badakhsh	2001
Shohreh	"Eshtebah Del"	Masoud Amini	Mehrdad Asemani	Amir Badakhsh	2001
Shohreh	"Shekayat"	Homayoon Houshiarnejad	Mehrdad Asemani	Manouchehr Cheshmazar	2008
Leila Forouhar	"Roozegare Eshgh"	Homayoon Houshiarnejad	Mehrdad Asemani	Schubert Avakian	1996
Leila Forouhar	"Pishkesh"	Homayoon Houshiarnejad	Mehrdad Asemani	Schubert Avakian	1998
Leila Forouhar	"Dele Sadeh"	Homayoon Houshiarnejad	Mehrdad Asemani	Schubert Avakian	1998
Leila Forouhar	"Neshooni"	Homayoon Houshiarnejad	Mehrdad Asemani	Schubert Avakian	2000
Nooshafarin	"Age Boodi"	Alireza Meybodi	Mehrdad Asemani	Brian Wayy	1995
Nooshafarin	"Eshghe Kamel"	Alireza Meybodi	Mehrdad Asemani	Manouchehr Cheshmazar	1995
Delaram	"Efadeh"	Masoud Fardmanesh	Mehrdad Asemani	Mohammad Moghaddam	1996
Delaram	"Amoo Yadegar"	Sirous Aliabadi	Mehrdad Asemani	Manouchehr Cheshmazar	1996
Fataneh	"Eshghe Moondegar"	Sina Izadbin	Mehrdad Asemani	Meraj Mirzayi	2019
Nahid	"Yade Maa Kardi"	Homayoon Houshiarnejad	Mehrdad Asemani	Manouchehr Cheshmazar	1998
Mansour	"Aghooshe Tou"	Yalda	Mehrdad Asemani	David Betsamo	1997
Susan Roshan	"Eshghe Rangi"	Masoud Fardmanesh	Mehrdad Asemani	Majid Ghorbani	2000
Sheila	"Nazok Del"	Homayoon Houshiarnejad	Mehrdad Asemani	Manouchehr Cheshmazar	1998
Saman	"Bahar"	Homayoon Houshiarnejad	Mehrdad Asemani	Schubert Avakian	2000
Saman	"Roorasty"	Homayoon Houshiarnejad	Mehrdad Asemani	Manouchehr Cheshmazar	2000
Saman	"Koocheye Khatereh"	Homayoon Houshiarnejad	Mehrdad Asemani	Brian Wayy	2000
Kambiz	"Shokoolat"	Paksima Zakipour	Mehrdad Asemani	Mohammad Sattari	2004
Arman	"Goli"	Homayoon Houshiarnejad	Mehrdad Asemani	Schubert Avakian	2003
Farrokh	"Goli Joon"	Alireza Meybodi	Mehrdad Asemani	Mahdad Zand Karimi	1996
Farrokh	"Zange Mardeseh"	Alireza Meybodi	Mehrdad Asemani	Manouchehr Cheshmazar	1996
Farrokh	"Sekeye Bahari"	Alireza Meybodi	Mehrdad Asemani	Manouchehr Cheshmazar	1996
Farrokh	"Bahar Khanom"	Alireza Meybodi	Mehrdad Asemani	Schubert Avakian	1997
Farrokh	"Doost Daram Kheyli Kouchik Sham"	Alireza Meybodi	Mehrdad Asemani	Schubert Avakian	1997
Farrokh	"Noun e Ghandi"	Alireza Meybodi	Mehrdad Asemani	Manouchehr Cheshmazar	1997
Behzad	"Azize Del"	Yalda	Mehrdad Asemani	Amir Badakhsh	2003
Behzad	"Cheshme Bad"	Homayoon Houshiarnejad	Mehrdad Asemani	Amir Badakhsh	2003
Toka	"6 Minutes"	Iraj Janatie Ataie	Mehrdad Asemani	Manouchehr Cheshmazar	2012
Toka	"Taboo"	Iraj Janatie Ataie	Mehrdad Asemani	Manouchehr Cheshmazar	2013
Toka	"Zan Payan"	Iraj Janatie Ataie	Mehrdad Asemani	Manouchehr Cheshmazar	2013
Soheila Golestani	"Irane Man"	Sina Izadbin	Mehrdad Asemani	Argamo Toros	2023
Ali Morshedi	"Yare Shirin"	Mehra Arianmehr	Mehrdad Asemani	Rasha Taghipour	2025
