= Googoosh discography =

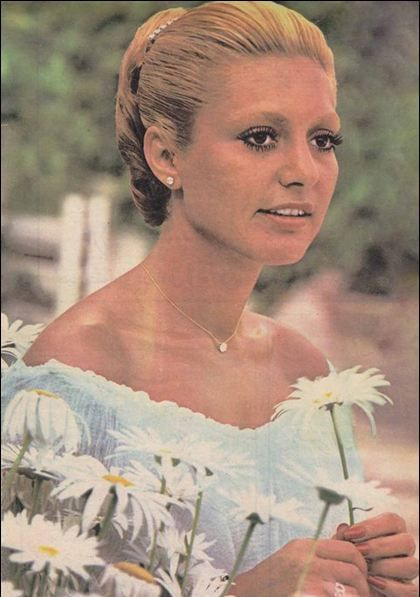
- Studio albums: 20

Iranian singer Googoosh has a recording career tracing back to 1966, when she released her first single “Ghesseye Vafaa”

== Studio albums ==
Year	Persian Title	English Title	Lyrics	Composer
1970	Do Panjareh	Two Windows	Ardalan Sarfaraz	Hassan Shamaizadeh; Varoujan
1971	Mordab	Swamp		Hassan Shamaizadeh
1972	Hamsafar	Fellow Traveler		Varoujan
1972	Kooh	Mountain	Ardalan Sarfaraz	Hassan Shamaizadeh
1974	Do Mahi	Two Fish	Shahyar Ghanbari	Varoujan; Babak Afshar
1975	Mosabbeb (with Dariush)			Babak Bayat
1975	Pol	Bridge	Iraj Janati Ataei	Varoujan
1977	Dar Emtedâde Šab	Along the Night	Iraj Janati Ataei	Babak Bayat
1978	Ageh Bemooni Ageh Namooni	If You Stay	Shahyar Ghanbari	Esfandiar Monfaredzadeh; Parviz Atabaki; Babak Afshar
1984	Behtarin Fasl-e-Taazeh	The Best Fresh Season	Iraj Janati Ataei	Farid Zaland
1989	TBA	TBA	TBA	TBA
1990	Jadeh	Road	Ardalan Sarafraz; Iraj Janati Ataei	Hassan Shamaizadeh; Parviz Atabaki
1990	Kavir	Desert	Ardalan Sarafraz; Iraj Janati Ataei	Hassan Shamaizadeh
1993	Yadam Basheh, Yadet Basheh (Shenasnameyeh 1)			
1995	Mann O Gonjeshkayeh Khoneh	Me and the Sparrows at Home		Hassan Shamaizadeh
1996	Setareh	Star	Shahyar Ghanbari	Esfandiar Monfaredzadeh; Babak Afshar
2000	Zartosht	Zoroaster	Nosrat Farzaneh	Babak Amini; Babak Bayat
2000	Asheghaneh	Love Songs		
2003	QQ Bang Bang		Zoya Zakarian	Mehrdad Asemani
2004	Akharin Khabar	Latest News	Zoya Zakarian; Shahyar Ghanbari	Mehrdad Asemani
2004	Snapshot by Mehrdad Asemani (3 duets: Nasleh Man (Our Generation), Setaareh Ay Setaareh (The Tape's Head And Tail), and Fairyland on Fire)			Mehrdad Asemani
2005	Manifest		Shahyar Ghanbari	Mehrdad Asemani
2008	Shabe Sepid	White Night	Alec Cartino	Mehrdad Asemani
2010	Hajme Sabz	Green Volume		
2012	Ejaz	Miracle	Raha Etemadi; Rumi; Roozbeh Bemani; Babak Roozbeh	Hassan Shamaizadeh; Nickan; Babak Saeedi; Alireza Afkari; Shubert Avakian; Googoosh
2015	Akse Khosoosi	Private Portrait	Babak Sahraee; Mina Jalali; Zoya Zakarian; Abbas Hazhir; Mohammad Farid Naseri; Malkoshoara Bahar; Iraj Janati Attaee	Nickan; Babak Amini; Reza Rohani; Sadegh Noujouki; Parviz Maghsadi; Varoujan
2021	Bisto Yek	Twenty One	Raha Etemadi	Siavash Ghomayshi

Compilation Albums

- 1996: Best of Googoosh, Vol, 1: Jadeh
- 1996: Best of Googoosh, Vol. 2: Mordab
- 1997: Best of Googoosh, Vol. 5: Kavir
- 1997: Best of Googoosh, Vol. 3: Doe Mahi
- 2000: Best of Googoosh, Vol. 4: Doe Panjereh
- ?: Best of Googoosh, Vol. 6
- 2000: Best of Googoosh "Forever"
- 2005: Golden Songs Vol. 1
- 2005: Golden Songs Vol. 2
- ?: Googoosh: 40 Golden Hits
- ?: 70's Golden Hits

'Best of 60's' Compilation Albums

- 2005: Best of 60's "Volume 2" Music of 1960 -1969
- 2005: Best of 60's "Volume 3" Music of 1960-1969

'Best of 70's' Compilation Albums

- 2005: Best of 70's, "Volume 1", Music of 1970-1979
- 2005: Best of 70's, "Volume 2", Music of 1970-1979
- 2005: Best of 70's, Volume 3", Music of 1970-1979
- 2005: Best of 70's, "Volume 5", Music of 1970-1979
- 2005: Best of 70's, "Volume 6", Music of 1970-1979
- 2005: Best of 70's, "Volume 7", Music of 1970-1979
- 2005: Best of 70's, "Volume 8", Music of 1970-1979
- 2005: Best of 70's, "Volume 9", Music of 1970-1979
- 2005: Best of 70's, "Volume 10", Music of 1970-1979
- 2005: Best of 70's, "Volume 13", Music of 1970-1979
- 2005: Best of 70's, "Volume 14", Music of 1970-1979

Videos/DVDs

- ?: Tohmat (DVD and CD set)
- ?: Googoosh 3 DVD Box Set

Live Albums:

- ?: Live in Concert
- 1999: Googoosh Live in Concert
- 2001: Live in Concert
