= Jaklin Derderian =

Iranian composer, lyricist, musician (1952–2025)

Jaklin Derderian ژاکلین دردریان
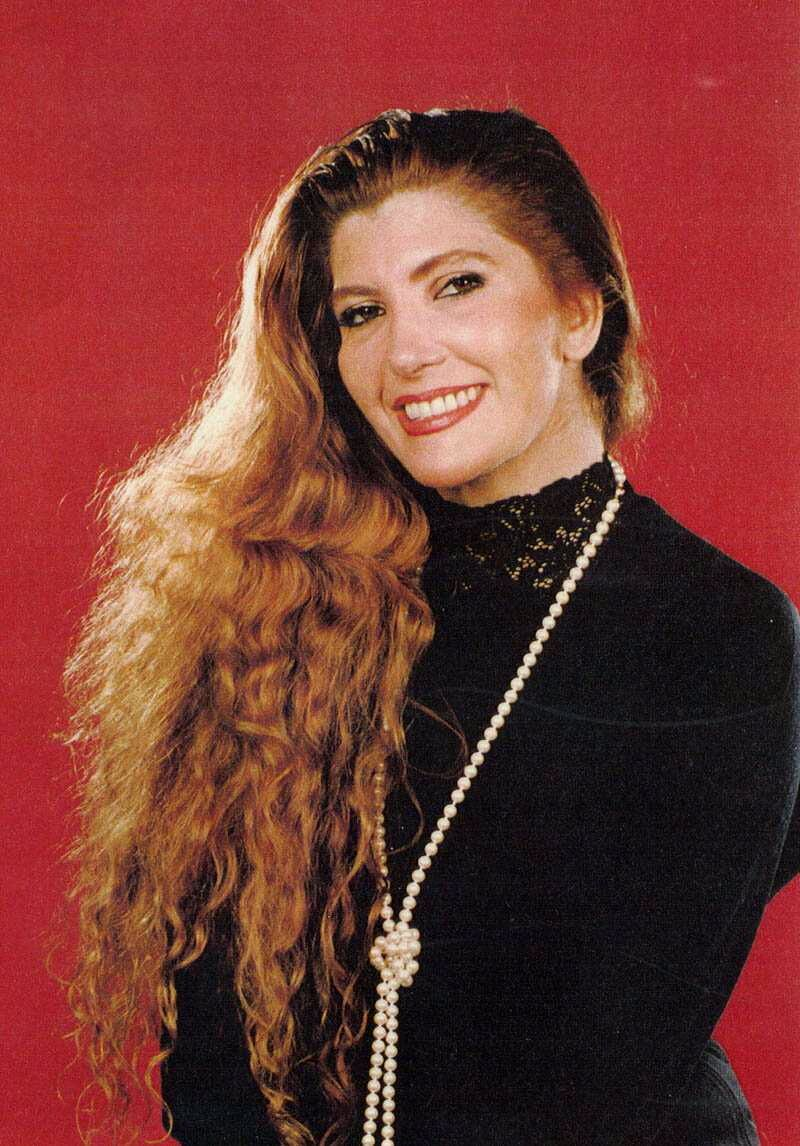

Background information
- Also known as: Jaklin, Jaklin Vigen, Jacqueline Derderian, Jacqueline Vigen
- Born: 19 December 1952; Tehran, Imperial State of Iran
- Died: 7 September 2025 (aged 72) Los Angeles, California, U.S.
- Genres: Persian pop, classical pop
- Occupations: Singer; songwriter; lyricist; composer; musician
- Instruments: Vocals; piano
- Years active: 1970s–2025
- Website: www.instagram.com/jaklinofficial/

Jaklin Derderian (Persian: ژاکلین دردریان, Armenian: Ժաքլին Դերդերյան; 19 December 1952 – 7 September 2025), known mononymously as Jaklin and sometimes referred to as Jaklin Vigen, was an Iranian composer, lyricist, and musician. She was the daughter of the iconic singer Vigen. She wrote songs for many famous Iranian pop and classical artists starting in the 1970s until her death in 2025.

== Early life ==
Jaklin along with her twin sister Aylin was born on 19 December 1952 in Tehran, into a musically rich Armenian-Iranian family. Her father, Vigen Derderian, often referred to as the "King of Jazz in Iran", was a pioneering figure in Iranian pop and jazz music. Jaklin was exposed to music via her father from a young age. She was sometimes referred to as Jaklin Vigen, due to her father's popularity.

== Career ==
Beginning in the 1970s, Jaklin embarked on a musical career primarily as a songwriter, composer, and lyricist. She created works for a who's who of Iranian artists, including Googoosh, for whom she penned the notable song "Parandeh" ("The Bird"). Other artists she wrote for include singers such as Shohreh, Mahasti, Moein, Sattar, Leila Forouhar, Ebi, Andy, Martik, Siavash Ghomayshi, Shakila, and Nooshafarin.

Her most extensive creative partnership was with Shohreh Solati—Jacqueline wrote and composed several of Shohreh's landmark albums, including Ghessegoo ("Storyteller"), Atre Zan ("Perfume"), Safar ("Journey"), and Havas ("Desire").

Jaklin also released her own albums and single tracks, featuring titles such as Ghosseh Jang ("Sorrow of War"), Booseh ("Kiss"), Ashti ("Reconciliation"), Shazdeh Pesar ("The Little Prince"), Mafia, Tekrar Nashodani ("Unrepeatable"), Khatere-ye Man ("My Memory"), Shokoufehaye Iran ("Blossoms of Iran"), Baraye To ("For You") and Ashk-e Penhooni ("Hidden Tears").

== Death ==
Jaklin, who had been battling blood cancer for several years, died on 7 September 2025 in Los Angeles, California.
