= Fereydoun Farrokhzad =

Iranian showman (1938–1992)

- فریدون فرخزاد
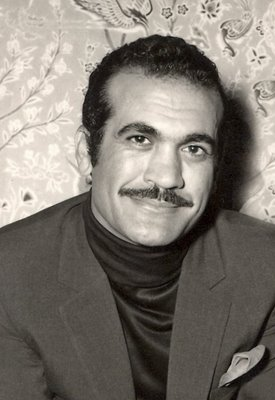
- Born: October 7, 1938; Tehran, Imperial State of Iran
- Died: August 5, 1992 (aged 55); Bonn, Germany
- Education: Ludwig-Maximilians-Universität München (Dr sc. pol)
- Occupations: Showman; host; poet; actor; political activist; singer; humanitarian; writer
- Years active: 1962–1992
- Spouses: Ania Buchkowski (m. 1962; div. 1972) Taraneh Sandoozi (m. 1974; div. 1974)
- Children: Rostam (died 2022)
- Relatives: Forugh Farrokhzad (sister); Pooran Farrokhzad (sister)
- Musical career
- Genre: Pop
- Labels: Avang Music; Caltex Records; Taraneh Enterprises Inc; Pars Video

Fereydoun Farrokhzad (Persian: فریدون فرخزاد; October 7, 1938 – August 5, 1992) was an Iranian showman, host, poet, actor, political activist, singer, humanitarian, and writer. He is best known for his television variety show, The Silver Carnation, which introduced and featured many artists, such as Ebi, Leila Forouhar, Shohreh, Sattar, Hayedeh, and many more.

Farrokhzad was forced into exile after the 1979 Iranian Revolution. After relocating to Germany, he was the victim of an assassination set up by the Islamic Republic government as part of the chain murders of Iran.

== Early life and career ==
Fereydoun Farrokhzad was born in Tehran, to career military officer Colonel Mohammad Bagher Farrokhzad (originally from Tafresh) and his wife Touran Vaziri-Tabar. He was the fourth of seven children (Pooran, Amir (Masoud), Forugh, Fereydoun, Gloria, Mehrdad, and Mehran). After graduating high school he moved to Germany and Austria for his post-secondary education. He received his doctorate in political science from the Ludwig-Maximilians-Universität München.

At a young age Fereydoun had a passion for poetry and for singing. He turned that passion to reality in 1962 when he started writing poems in German which were published in two German newspapers. In 1964 he published his collection of poems called "Fasleh Deegar" (Another Season). His book was critically acclaimed and was honored by many German poets. Five months after the release of "Fasleh Deegar", Fereydoun Farrokhzad received the Poetry Award of Berlin. For a couple of years Farrokhzad was a member of the Munich Academy of Poetry. In 1966 he found his way to the Television and Radio of Munich. On Radio he had a comedy and music program which played middle eastern music including music from Iran. On TV he created and produced a show called "Khiyaban-haye Alp" (Alpine Roads). In 1967 he returned to Iran and performed on successful radio and TV shows. His most successful TV show was "Mikhakeh Noghrei" (Silver Carnation), on which singer/actress Nooshafarin began her singing career with the song Ghebleh ("Qibla"), and his radio show which aired every other Friday mornings called "Jom'eh Bazzar" (Friday Bazaar). The TV show was watched by millions of Iranians. On the show Farrokhzad introduced and discovered a number of Iranian artists including Sattar, Shohreh, Shahram Solati, Ebi, Morteza, Rouhi Savoji, Hamid Shabkhiz, Leila Forouhar, Saeed Mohammadi, and various others. After the 1979 revolution, Farrokhzad was imprisoned, then released. He escaped the country and settled in Germany.

== Politics and activism ==
=== Political views ===
According to Voice of America, Farrokhzad was known by his fans as an "educated patriot" who frequently criticised the Islamic Republic and its leaders and who was present during many demonstrations against the clerical government.

Farrokhzad produced a weekly radio show for the "Voice of the Flag of Freedom Organization of Iran," the radio station of the Organization of Kaviyani Banner, an "organization of exiled supporters of the Iranian monarchy." Farrokhzad also acted in a film, I Love Vienna, which was considered by some Iranian authorities as anti-Islamic.

== Personal life ==
Esfandiar Monfaredzadeh claimed that Farrokhzad was homosexual. He said: "His main obstacle was the homosexuality that he was not ashamed of; he knew it and he wanted people to understand it."

Farrokhzad married and divorced twice. His first marriage took place in 1962, to a German-Polish woman named Ania Buchkowski, whom he met in Oxford. Like Farrokhzad, she had a passion for poetry and theater; it was after meeting her that Farrokhzad started writing poems. The result of this marriage was a son named Rostam. Rostam died on February 12th, 2022, ending the immediate bloodline of Farrokhzad. Farrokhzad and Ania later separated and got divorced. In 1974 he married an Iranian woman named Taraneh.

Besides his native language of Persian, he also spoke German.

== Murder and aftermath ==
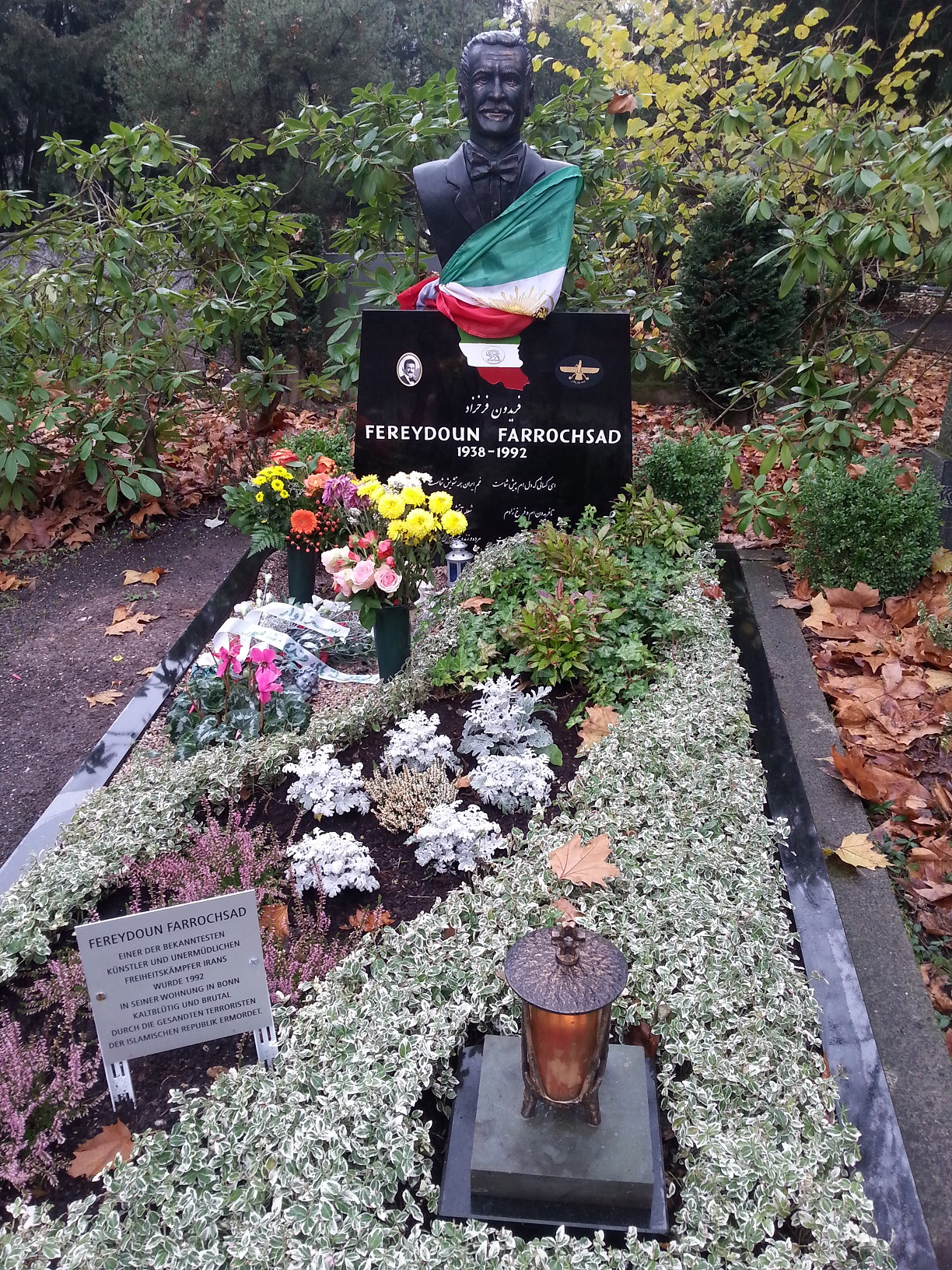
Farrokhzad's grave in Nordfriedhof, Bonn, Germany.

On the evening of August 5, police officers responded to cries for help at the building where Farrokhzad lived, but were unable to identify the apartment where the screams originated from. On August 8, 1992, Farrokhzad's body was found in the kitchen of his apartment in Bonn, Germany after neighbours reported barking by his two dogs. Farrokhzad had been killed violently, having been stabbed repeatedly in the face and upper torso. Many urban legends surround Farrokhzad's death, including the widely repeated myth that he was beheaded.

Prior to his murder, Farrokhzad had been involved in producing an opposition radio program and, reportedly, received death threats. In his show at the Royal Albert Hall in London, he criticised Khomeini and made fun of Khomeini's obsession with sex in his Ressaleh book, which followed death threats and concerns for him.

According to the U.S. state-funded Voice of America (VOA), the murder was "widely believed to be the work of Iran's Islamic government".

In March 2025, Mohsen Rafiqdoost, former Minister of the Islamic Revolutionary Guard Corps, admitted that the IRGC had paid Basque separatists to assassinate dissidents abroad, including Farrokhzad.

== Legacy ==
Farrokhzad remains a significant Iranian cultural icon whose popular music and television programs continue to be circulated through various media platforms. His murder—a political assassination of a celebrity activist entertainer—is a well known and oft-cited event amongst Iranians.

The play ‘Things Hidden Since the Foundation of the World’ by Javaad Alipoor explores the international cultural coverage of his death.

== Filmography ==
=== Film ===
Year	Title	Role	Director	Notes
1991	I Love Vienna	Ali Mohamed	Houchang Allahyari	Selected as the Austrian entry for the Best Foreign Language Film at the 64th Academy Awards

== See also ==
- Forugh Farrokhzad
- List of unsolved murders (1980–1999)
- Mina Assadi
- Simin Behbahani
