= Hassan Shamaizadeh =

Hassan Shamaizadeh حسن شماعی‌زاده
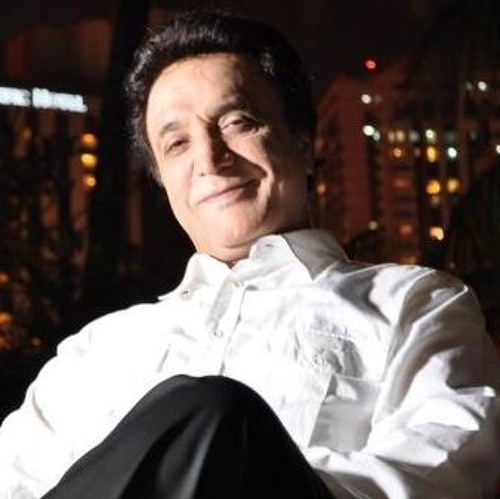

Background information
- Born: Hassan; January 15, 1943 (age 83); Isfahan, Imperial State of Iran
- Genres: Persian pop; Dance
- Occupations: Composer, singer, songwriter and legend
- Instruments: Saxophone, flute, oboe, clarinet, piano and a legend
- Years active: 1966–present
- Labels: Taraneh; Caltex; Avang Records/Avang; MZM Records

Hassan Shamaizadeh (Persian: حسن شماعی‌زاده, also Romanized as Hasan-é Šamâ'izâde; born January 15, 1943, in Isfahan) is an Iranian pop music composer, singer, and instrumentalist.

Initially, Shamaizadeh played the clarinet and other wind instruments before transitioning to composition, during which he also engaged with the piano and other instruments.

Some of the most significant Iranian pop songs, performed by artists such as Googoosh, Shohreh Solati, Dariush, Moein, Homeyra, Hayedeh, Mahasti, Leila Forouhar, and Aref, among others, were composed by Shamaizadeh. Following the 1979 Iranian Revolution, he immigrated to the United States with his family, where he continued his career in composition and singing. Most of his works have been arranged by other Iranian musicians.

== Early life and career ==
=== Childhood and Entry into Music ===
Hassan Shamaizadeh was born on 22 November 1942 in Isfahan, Iran. He began his artistic career at the age of 13 as an instrumentalist in the orchestra of a theater in Isfahan. A graduate of Adab High School in Isfahan in 1962, he moved to Tehran to further his musical career. After working in theater for some time, he joined Radio Iran in 1966. Simultaneously, he performed in jazz and pop orchestras for younger audiences and collaborated with several Spanish orchestras, while also playing in Tehran’s radio and cultural centers. He briefly played the saxophone for the Black Cats band.

=== Beginning of Composition ===
Shamaizadeh started composing in 1972. He attributes his shift to composition to a neck disc condition caused by the physical strain of playing heavy brass instruments for extended periods (15–16 hours daily), which made it difficult to continue as an instrumentalist. His earliest compositions included Geryeh (performed by Amir Rasaei), Hala Kheili Direh (performed by Aref), and Nemiad (with lyrics by Arash Sezavar, performed by Googoosh), all released concurrently.

=== 1970s Career ===
During the 1970s, Shamaizadeh established himself as a prominent composer among his contemporaries, creating successful works for well-known artists such as Googoosh, Dariush, Shohreh, Ebi, Sattar, Farhad, Aref, Martik, Ramesh, Nooshafarin, and Moein. Notable among these is some of Googoosh’s most iconic songs. Another significant work from this period is Shekar, performed by Ebi, which won first place among 209 participants at the 1975 Istanbul Music Festival in Turkey.

=== Beginning of Singing Career ===
Shamaizadeh began singing in 1973 during a live performance on the Cheshmak television show on the last Friday of Mordad 1352 (August 1973). According to him, this debut was at the audience’s request. During the show, attended by Googoosh, Ardalan Sarfaraz, and Varoujan, he performed Mordab, with lyrics by Ardalan Sarfaraz and arrangement by Varoujan. The song became one of the most popular of its time, selling approximately 198,000 vinyl records, a remarkable achievement.

His singing garnered significant attention, leading to the creation and performance of other popular songs, including Aghaghi (with lyrics by Shahyar Ghanbari), released in 1975. In 1975, a poll by Zan-e Rooz magazine named Shamaizadeh the best male singer and best composer of the year, with approximately 50,000 votes.

=== The Googoosh, Shamaizadeh, and Sarfaraz Collaboration Triangle ===
One of the notable collaborations in Iranian pop music was the creative triangle formed by Ardalan Sarfaraz (lyricist), Hassan Shamaizadeh (composer), and Googoosh (singer). Some of their works were arranged by Varoujan. Together, they produced 17 songs, including well-known pieces such as Koli, Jaddeh, Kieh Kieh, Doorahi, Kooh, Bemoon ta Bemoonam, Gharib-e Ashna, Mordab, Kavir, Do Panjereh, and Man o Gonjeshk-haye Khooneh.

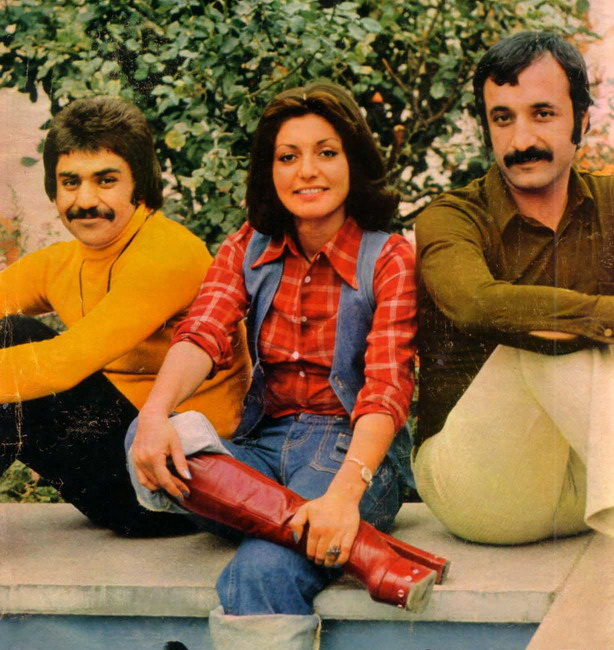
Ardalan Sarfaraz, Googoosh and Hassan Shamaizadeh in 1972–73

Shamaizadeh and Sarfaraz also collaborated successfully with other singers, producing hits such as Cheshm-e Man o Dastay-e To (performed by Dariush) and Panjereh (performed by Moein).

The 1979 Iranian Revolution ended this collaboration. Googoosh remained in Iran until 2000, while Sarfaraz and Shamaizadeh each immigrated to different countries. Shamaizadeh claims that, despite being released over five years (1973–1978), their collaborative songs were created during a brief one-year-and-eight-month period.

Post-revolution, although a few works with Shamaizadeh’s music and Sarfaraz’s lyrics were released, their collaboration soon ceased. According to Sarfaraz, their professional paths had already diverged before the revolution. Shamaizadeh has expressed regret and surprise over Sarfaraz’s lack of communication in an interview with Behnood Mokri on the Shabahang program, without elaborating on any specific disputes.

=== 1979 Revolution ===
Following the 1979 Iranian Revolution, members of the People’s Fedayeen Guerrillas wrote slogans on Shamaizadeh’s house, stating, “Shamaizadeh, the capitalist, must be executed.” On 14 February 1979, a group attacked his home. Informed by a neighbor, Shamaizadeh hid in the residence of a military officer connected to the royal court and fled Iran the next day via an SOS flight, first to Copenhagen and then to the United States. He returned to Iran four months later, stayed for five months, and then left permanently, settling in Los Angeles. During the 1980s and 1990s, he was one of the most prolific Iranian pop artists, releasing 17 albums as a singer and composing extensively for other Iranian artists abroad. He played a key role in introducing second-generation Iranian pop singers such as Mansour, Omid, Susan Roshan, and Sheila.

=== Collaboration with Shohreh Solati ===
Shamaizadeh’s most extensive collaboration after Googoosh was with Shohreh Solati, producing 14 songs. Some of Shohreh’s most significant works, including Tolo, Kaghaz-e Sefid, Aroosi, Kelid, Ehsas-e Zan, Devooneh, Bemiram Ay Bemiram, Shenidam, Rah, and Be Ghorboonet Begardam, were composed by Shamaizadeh.They also performed Be Ghorboonet Begardam as a duet. Shohreh’s performance of Tolo made her one of the most prominent and popular female pop singers of the 1980s.

Shamaizadeh’s compositions for Shohreh, such as Tolo, Kaghaz-e Sefid, and Kelid, are characterized by emotional and soaring melodies. These works were enhanced by collaborations with lyricists such as Bijan Samandar, Masoud Fardmanesh, Homayoun Hoshiyarnejad, Hoda Kordbagh, and Iraj Razmjoo. During this period, Shamaizadeh explored diverse and sometimes contrasting musical styles compared to his pre-revolution works, focusing increasingly on upbeat, rhythmic songs suitable for dance, such as Bishtar Bishtar, Damad, Yek Dokhtar Daram Shah Nadareh, Tavalod, and Aroosi. The popular song Pariya, performed by Shahram Shabpareh, was also composed during this time.

=== Collaboration with Babak Sahraei ===
In the 2000s, Shamaizadeh collaborated extensively with Babak Sahraei. Their most notable joint work was Hayahoo, released in the winter of 2011 with Shamaizadeh’s vocals. Other collaborative works include Sakhreh, Mamnoonam, Mahtab-e Naz-e Man, Az Koja Miay, To Cheshay-e Man Nega Kon, and Avazekhan Na Avaz (performed by Shamaizadeh); Jashn-e Ayeneh (performed by Pouya); To Ro Mikham (performed by Sheila); Eshgh-e Toofani and Atishbazi (performed by Susan Roshan); and Delhoreh (performed by Soroush).

In an interview on the Greatest Hits program on Manoto TV, Shamaizadeh stated that many of his compositions were never performed due to the inability of lyricists to provide suitable lyrics. However, he noted that this issue was resolved through his collaboration with Babak Sahraei, who wrote lyrics that perfectly complemented his compositions.

=== Ceasing Composition for Other Artists ===
In 2006, Shamaizadeh announced that he would no longer compose for other artists and would only perform his own songs, citing feelings of being exploited and having his rights disregarded in his compositional work. However, in a 2012 interview with Behnood Mokri on Shabahang (Voice of America), he stated, “But Googoosh is different.” A year later, he revealed he was working with a young singer named Parisa, whose songs with his compositions were soon to be released.

=== Renewed Collaboration with Googoosh ===
In an interview with Javanan magazine in the United States, Googoosh shared that she was deeply moved by Shamaizadeh’s Hayahoo and requested to perform it herself. Shamaizadeh agreed, and Googoosh recorded the song in his studio, marking their first collaboration in 34 years.

Googoosh provided several lyrics for Shamaizadeh to compose, but he found them unsuitable for an artist of her stature. Following the release of Hayahoo, Googoosh made comments during her concerts that Shamaizadeh perceived as mocking and distorting their shared history, causing him distress. In a Shabahang interview, he elaborated on his disappointment but also expressed his deep admiration for Googoosh, stating,

“I love Googoosh passionately. My love for Googoosh is not that of a man for a woman; it is the love of Hassan Shamaizadeh, the composer, for Googoosh, the singer.”

=== Memories Triangle Concert Tour with Googoosh and Ardalan Sarfaraz ===
In June 2017, Googoosh announced the resumption of her collaboration with Shamaizadeh and Sarfaraz by sharing a photo of herself with Shamaizadeh at the piano. Their first joint concert, titled Memories Triangle, was held in late October 2017 in Toronto, launching a global tour. In February 2018, their first collaborative single in nearly 40 years, Memories Triangle, was released, featuring a duet by Googoosh and Shamaizadeh. The tour later included Manouchehr Cheshmazar and Martik.

== Musical Style ==
=== Composition ===
As a composer, Shamaizadeh believes:

“Whenever I write a song, I strive to create music that resonates with younger generations. Music should be youthful, joyful, and hopeful.”

Before 1979, his compositions were often melancholic, reflecting the mood of the era, and sometimes carried a grand, epic quality, as seen in songs like Jaddeh and Mordab. After the 1979 Revolution, his immigration to the United States, and the Iran-Iraq War, his music shifted toward upbeat, dance-oriented songs to meet the public’s need for joy during difficult times. Shamaizadeh noted that societal challenges, such as war, create a demand for uplifting music to counter distress.

He attributes the reduction of upbeat songs in his later work to his advancing age and the lack of suitable lyrics:

“For upbeat songs, the lyrics need to be clearer, more direct, and vibrant. At my age, I can’t pursue overly romantic lyrics.”

Some of Shamaizadeh’s compositions, particularly those for Moein, incorporate elements of traditional Iranian music, such as Gham-e Ghorobat from the album Faryad-e Rang or Marg-e Eshgh from Golhay-e Khis, which feature traditional Persian instruments and vocal styles. He has also drawn inspiration from regional Iranian music, such as the southern-inspired Aroosi or the Kurdish-themed Kordestan. Additionally, Shamaizadeh has explored kherabati and lalehzari styles, evident in the album Golhay-e Khis.

Beyond Iranian influences, some of his works incorporate Spanish or Arabic musical elements, such as Parastesh from the album Parastesh or Guitar from Avazekhan Na Avaz. He has also experimented with techno and trance styles in songs like Donya (Parastesh), Hamsaram (Dooshizeh Khanom), and Gol (Avazekhan Na Avaz), adapting to contemporary musical trends.

Shamaizadeh has composed both by writing music for existing lyrics and by creating melodies first, followed by lyrics. He prefers composing melodies first, believing that successful works often result from this approach. He places less value on composing for pre-written lyrics, arguing that the poet has already shaped 50% of the song. He strives to ensure that music remains central in his works, rather than being overshadowed by lyrics, a common tendency in Iranian music.

Among his compositions, Shamaizadeh favors Khooneh for its melodic structure and progression. Of the singers he has worked with, he found Googoosh the easiest to collaborate with, followed by Moein for post-revolution works in Los Angeles. Among lyricists, he frequently praises Ardalan Sarfaraz and holds Bijan Samandar in high regard. He admires the works of composers Siavash Ghomayshi and Parviz Maghsadi and believes that, historically, female Iranian singers, such as Homeyra, have demonstrated greater vocal mastery than their male counterparts.

=== Singing ===
Shamaizadeh believes that his singing career enabled the creation of many compositions that might not have been realized otherwise, as it provided motivation for his compositional work. He also notes that several singers have been influenced by his vocal style. Additionally, singing has been his primary source of income, unlike composing.

== Personal life ==
In 1968, he married Fatemeh (Noushin). They have a son, Afshin, a dentist, and a daughter, Aghigh (known as Nikki in the U.S.), who works in real estate. Shamaizadeh has composed songs for his family, including Pesaram for his son, Yek Dokhtar Daram Shah Nadareh for his daughter, and Hamsaram and Madyoon for his wife. He also performed the songs Rap and Doost Daram as duets with his daughter Aghigh. He considers his son’s university graduation to be the most cherished moment of his life.

An animal lover, Shamaizadeh spends two to three hours daily with his pets.

Hassan Shamaizadeh resides in Los Angeles, California.

== Political views ==
Before the 1979 Revolution, Shamaizadeh was not politically active. Post-revolution, he expressed opposition to the Islamic Republic through songs like Shahr-e Khali. He believes Iran needed reform rather than a revolution.

His composition Shahbanoo, performed by Sattar and dedicated to Farah Pahlavi, led to speculation about monarchist affiliations. However, in an interview with Voice of America’s Parazit program, he denied this, identifying as a freedom advocate opposed to any ideology.

Following the 2009 Iranian election protests, Shamaizadeh, along with Sattar and Shifteh, performed Mardom in support of the protesters. In another Voice of America interview, he called for the release of political prisoners, respect for human rights, and acknowledgment of dissenting voices by Iran’s government.

In January 2024, he released a single titled Zan, Zendegi, Azadi in support of the Woman, Life, Freedom movement.

In December 2024, he declared, “Until now, I was a political activist; from now on, I am a political fighter.”

== Confiscation of Property ==
In 1993, Shamaizadeh’s house in Tehran’s Jamaran district was confiscated under a ruling by Hosseinali Nayeri, a judge of the Tehran Islamic Revolutionary Court. His wife traveled to Iran three times in the early 1990s, each time for six months, to attend court proceedings. The court justified the confiscation by declaring the property “ownerless” due to Shamaizadeh’s income being deemed from an “illegitimate profession” (singing and composing, including the song Nefrin bar Jang). Nayeri argued that “war is a blessing for us.” The property was seized by the Executive Headquarters of Imam’s Directive and allocated to third parties, who have resided there without Shamaizadeh’s consent.

Shamaizadeh has repeatedly stated that the property was purchased with his wife’s paternal inheritance and registered in their children’s names, unrelated to him personally. On 5 April 2018, he raised the issue again on Instagram, accusing Nayeri, a deputy of Iran’s Supreme Court and a key figure in the 1988 political prisoner executions, of confiscating and occupying the property for personal gain and attempting to sell it through forged documents.

The song Khooneh from the 1996 album Akharin Savar was composed and written about this property and its confiscation.

Shamaizadeh shared the complete address and map of the property on Instagram as follows: Bahonar (Niavaran) Street, Feizieh (Jamshidieh) Street, 24th (Jebeli) Street, Maryam Alley, first white door on the right.

== Discography ==
- 1973 – Mordaab ( "Maarsh")
- 1973 – Safar ( "Journey")
- 1973 – Naraftan Moondan – 45 rpm single (Lavi Records)
- 1974 – Ojagh ( "Four") b/w Hobab – 45 rpm single (Caspian Records)
- 1974 – Esm-eh To ( "Your name") b/w Gharib-e Ashenaa – 45 rpm single (Caspian Records)
- 1974 – Hamoomi b/w Kalakat(instrumental) – 45 rpm single (Ahang Rooz Records)
- 1975 – Benevis ("Write") b/w Seda – 45 rpm single (Ahang Rooz Records)
- 1975 – Deh ( "Village") / Chel Cheleh – 45 rpm single (Ahang Rooz Records)
- 1975 – Aghigh ("Jewel") / Sojdegah – 45 rpm single (Ahang Rooz Records)
- 1975 – Gol-E Naz-E Par Pare Man – (Cassette-only release)
- 1976 – bad az to ( "After You")
- 1976 – Aghaghi ( "You are a jewel")
- 1977 – Bumi
- 1977 – Talaaye Kaaghazi (With Paajuki)
- 1978 – Mehmuni ( "Party")
- 1980 – Avaz-e Parvaaz ( "Flight Song")
- 1981 – Gol Aftab Gardoon
- 1982 – Golhayeh khis
- 1984 – Bishtar Bishtar
- 1985 – Kamtar Kamtar ( "Fewer")
- 1985 – Kooch (With Homeyra )
- 1986 – Dokhtar-e Mardom
- 1987 – Ghasalak
- 1988 – Hafteh Shab
- 1988 – Zende Bad Eshgh
- 1990 – Gol Yadeh1, Yadeh2
- 1992 – Atash Rooyeh Khakestar
- 1993 – Ye Dokhtar Daram Shah Nadareh
- 1994 – Bolooreh Mahtab
- 1996 – Akhareen Savaar ( "Last knight")
- 1997 – Parvaz Eshgh-o
- 1998 – Parastesh ( "Adoration")
- 2001 – Morvarid ( "Pearl")
- 2002 – Dooshizeh Khaanum ( "madam")
- 2006 – Singer not the Song
- 2012 – Hayahoo (Digital-only Single)
- 2018 – Mosalase Khatereha (The Memory Makers) (ft. Googoosh)
- 2018 – ghafas
- 2018 – Tanhaei
- 2020 – Aghaze Parvaz
