= Nickan Ebrahimi =

Iranian composer (born 1984)

- Also known as: Nickan
- Born: October 20, 1984 (age 41); Tehran, Iran
- Occupation(s): Composer, Music producer
- Instrument: Piano
- Years active: (2000 – present)
- Website: Nickan.net

Nickan Ebrahimi (Persian: نیکان ابراهیمی; born 20 October 1984 in Tehran) is an Iranian composer and music producer.

== Musical career ==
Ebrahimi is an Iranian composer who started his career in 2000. He has collaborated with high-profile Iranian singers such as Dariush Eghbali, Googoosh, Aref Arefkia, Hassan Shamaizadeh, and Reza Sadeghi.

== Composer ==
Year	Music	Singer	Lyrics	Arrangement	Composer
2015	Dadashi	Googoosh	Babak Sahraee	Nickan Ebrahimi	Nickan Ebrahimi
2015	Akse Khosoosi	Googoosh	Babak Sahraee	Nickan Ebrahimi	Nickan Ebrahimi
2015	Eshgh	Googoosh	Babak Sahraee	Nickan Ebrahimi	Nickan Ebrahimi
2017	Do Panjereh (New Version)	Googoosh	Ardalan Sarfaraz	Hassan Shamaizadeh	Nickan Ebrahimi
2018	Mosalase Khatereha	Googoosh, Hassan Shamaizadeh	Ardalan Sarfaraz	Nickan Ebrahimi	Nickan Ebrahimi
2012	Hayahoo	Googoosh	Babak Sahraee	Hassan Shamaizadeh	Nickan Ebrahimi
2015	Lalaee	Googoosh	Babak Sahraee	Toraj Shabankhani	Nickan Ebrahimi
2013	Gonahe Bacheha Chieh	Dariush Eghbali	Babak Sahraee	Nickan Ebrahimi	Nickan Ebrahimi
2013	Toofan	Aref Arefkia	Babak Sahraee	Hamed Hanifi	Nickan Ebrahimi
2012	Hayahoo	Hassan Shamaizadeh	Babak Sahraee	Hassan Shamaizadeh	Nickan Ebrahimi
2012	Mamnonam	Hassan Shamaizadeh	Babak Sahraee	Hassan Shamaizadeh	Nickan Ebrahimi
2013	Javooni	Hassan Shamaizadeh	Milad Afshin	Hassan Shamaizadeh	Nickan Ebrahimi
2015	Tasmim	Hassan Shamaizadeh	Milad Afshin	Hassan Shamaizadeh	Nickan Ebrahimi
2014	Esarat	Hassan Shamaizadeh	Rashid Ebrahimi	Hassan Shamaizadeh	Nickan Ebrahimi
2009	Ojagh	Hassan Shamaizadeh	Ardalan Sarfaraz	Hassan Shamaizadeh	Nickan Ebrahimi
2016	Kavir	Hassan Shamaizadeh	Ardalan Sarfaraz	Hassan Shamaizadeh	Nickan Ebrahimi
2017	Masoomaneh	Reza Sadeghi	Saber Ghadimi	Nickan Ebrahimi	Nickan Ebrahimi
2016	Maho Moohat	Reza Sadeghi	Babak Sahraee	Nickan Ebrahimi	Nickan Ebrahimi
2017	Mobtala	Reza Sadeghi	Reza Sadeghi	Reza Sadeghi	Nickan Ebrahimi
2015	Asheghi	Reza Sadeghi	Babak Sahraee	Amirabass Hasanzadeh	Nickan Ebrahimi

== Albums ==
Year	Album name	Singer	Genre	Arrangement	Composer
2006	Shadi Haroome	Reza Raad	Pop music	Nickan Ebrahimi	Nickan Ebrahimi
2011	Manoto	Mani Rahanama	Pop music	Nickan Ebrahimi	Nickan Ebrahimi
2012	In Roozha	Faraz Jadid	Pop music	Nickan Ebrahimi	Nickan Ebrahimi
2013	Niuoosh	Instrumental	Instrumental	Nickan Ebrahimi	Nickan Ebrahimi
2014	Khaterat Musical	Instrumental	Instrumental	Nickan Ebrahimi	Nickan Ebrahimi
