= Susan Roshan =

Iranian singer (born 1967)

Susan Roshan سوزان روشن
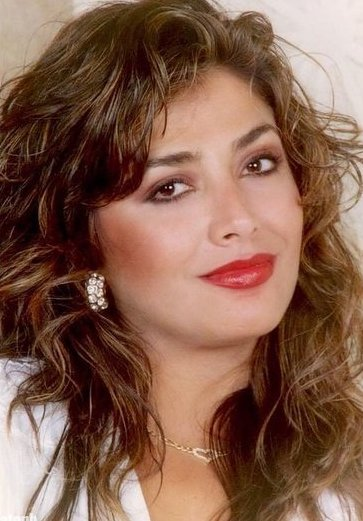

Background information
- Born: 23 September 1967 (age 58); Tehran, Iran
- Genres: Pop, R&B, dance, rock
- Occupations: Singer, songwriter
- Years active: 1985–present
- Labels: Taraneh; Caltex Records (1992–2000); Pars Video (2006–)
- Website: Official website

Susan Roshan (Persian: سوزان روشن, born 23 September 1967) is an Iranian singer, who currently lives in California, United States. After the Iranian Revolution, she moved to the United States with her parents and brother at twelve.

== Life ==
Susan Roshan was born on 23 September 1967 in Tehran. Her parents, Manouchehr Roshan and Fereshteh Roshan, were both from Hamadan. At the age of 10, in 1977, Susan migrated with her family to the United States.

Her brother, Peiman Roshan, was her primary supporter in pursuing a singing career. At 16, Susan performed on stage for the first time with Hassan Shamaizadeh, debuting with the song Hala Baz Dobareh Man in 1985, later covered by Aref Arefkia. Her first music video, Na, Na, Nemikham, composed by Shamaizadeh, also marked her entry into the music scene.

Over the course of her career, Susan wrote lyrics for several of her songs, including Arya (in collaboration with Paxima), Dasteh Dasteh, Haghighat, Nafahmidam, Khatoon, Har Kas Khodai Dareh, Mardi Goftan, Zani Goftan, and Fekr Mikardam.

=== 1980s: Early albums and professional career ===
Susan’s first independent album, Khaakestar, was released in 1986 by Taraneh Records, featuring several covers of songs composed by Babak Afshar previously performed by other artists. About a year later, in 1987, she released the collaborative album Golriz with Hayedeh, Mahasti, and Sattar, featuring lyrics by Homa Mirafshar and music by Babak Afshar.

Her second independent album, Dorogh Nago, was released in 1990 by Taraneh Records. For this album, Susan collaborated with artists such as Jacqueline, Ahmad Pejman, Sadegh Nojouki, and Manouchehr Cheshmazar.

=== 1990s: Four albums and rise to fame ===
After a three-and-a-half-year hiatus, Susan released her third independent album, Bibi Eshgh, in 1995, which brought her significant fame. The album included some of her most iconic songs, such as Ghamar Baz, Haghighat, and Arya. The music video for Arya, directed by Farzan Deljou, was one of the most expensive Iranian music videos and became the first Iranian music video aired on MTV.

In 1996, Susan collaborated with Siavash Shams on the album Didaar, released by Caltex Records. The album featured six songs, three performed by Susan and three by Siavash Shams. This marked her first collaboration with Farid Zoland.

Her fourth independent album, Shahzadeh-ye Eshgh, was released in 1998 after a year and a half of production. For this album, Susan ventured into songwriting and co-composed two tracks, Nafahmidam and Khatoon, with Farokh Ahi.

Her fifth independent album, Hamkelasi, was released in 2000, featuring new collaborations with artists such as Masoud Fardmanesh, Mehrdad Asemani, and Farzin Farhadi. After this album, Susan decided to take a break from music and, at her brother Peiman’s suggestion, pursued a career in real estate development.

=== 2000s: Final album and 17-year hiatus ===
After several years of silence, Susan released her last album, Vesvaseh, in the fall of 2006 through Pars Video. In this album, she renewed her collaboration with Hassan Shamaizadeh and worked with Farokh Ahi, as well as lyricists from Iran, including Babak Sahraei, Taraneh Mokarram, and Javad Sharifpour, for the first time.

Following the release of Vesvaseh, Susan relocated to Texas and focused on her real estate company, Roshan Towers, which she had started years earlier. During this period, she performed her previous songs at private events. After a 17-year hiatus, Susan returned to music with the song Lalaei, dedicated to the grieving mothers of the Woman, Life, Freedom movement. In addition to resuming concerts, she now releases a new single every three months.

She had a child in March 2025 at the age of 57.

== Discography ==
Year	Album	Label / Notes
1985	Khakestar	Taraneh Records releases
1992	Doroogh Nagoo	Taraneh Records releases
1995	Bibi Eshgh	Caltex Records releases
1996	Didar	Caltex Records releases, with Siavash
1998	Shahzadeh Eshgh	Caltex Records releases
2000	Hamkelasi	Caltex Records releases
2006	Vasvaseh	Pars Video releases
