= Derderian =

Derderian or Derderyan (Armenian: Դերդերյան) is an Armenian surname. "Derder" (Դերդերյ) in Armenian means priest. Notable people with the surname include:

- Hovnan Derderian (born 1957), Lebanese-Armenian Apostolic archbishop
- Jacqueline Derderian (1952–2025) Iranian-Armenian Singer-songwriter
- Mariana Derderian (born 1980), Chilean actress
- Yeghishe Derderian of Jerusalem (1911–1990), Armenian bishop and scholar
- Viguen Derderian (1929–2003), Iranian-Armenian singer
