= Babak Bayat =

Background information
- Born: Ali Hossein Bayat Motlagh; 13 June 1946; Tehran, Iran
- Origin: Iran
- Died: 26 November 2006 (aged 60)
- Occupations: Composer, performing musician
- Instruments: Piano , Accordion
- Years active: 1967–2006

Babak Bayat (Persian: بابک بیات,13 June 1946 – 26 November 2006) was an Iranian songwriter and film score composer. He was repeatedly nominated for the Crystal Simorgh award in the field of soundtrack at the Fajr Film Festival and received this award twice in 1991 and 1997.

== Biography ==
Ali Hossein Bayat Motlagh, known as Babak Bayat, was born on 13 June 1946, in Tehran. His father wanted him to become an athlete and go to an officer's college and start a military life, but he chose music. Bayat entered the Higher Conservatory of Music. He was 19 years old when he started working at the Tehran Opera and became acquainted with classical and world music under the supervision of Evelyn Baghtcheban, Samin Baghtcheban, and Nosratullah Zaboli. He began his artistic career as an official singer in the Baghtcheban Choir. He later developed a deep friendship with Mohammad Oshal, composer and conductor of the Folk Jazz Orchestra, who was involved in his artwork.

Iraj Jannati Ataei, a poet, songwriter and playwright who continued to play music with Babak Bayat from his childhood until before the revolution, was very influential in the life of Bayat and his family, which led to the creation of many songs, including: Gharibeh, The forest, the dead end, the house, the cry under water, Ali Konkuri, Tapesh, Khatoon, Sayeh, Khorjin (Eastern Lady), The Bad Gray Season (Noble Spirit), The Roof, There was no one like you, The Scout (O great one) and many other songs Led. Babak Bayat started the music of the film with the film Gharibeh, which was made with Varoujan. After The Stranger, Bayat composed the music for the films Sun in the Swamp, Sunny Night (with the song Doll of My Story), Underwater Scream, The Ring TV Series, and many other soundtracks.

After the 1979 Iranian Revolution, Babak Bayat continued his musical activity with his friend Ebrahim Zalzadeh and with the "dandelion cassette", Samad Behrangi's biography. After that, the "Golden Rooster Fairy Shirt" Cassette with Ahmad Shamlou, and for the "Silence is full of the unspoken" cassettes and "Picking up the dawn", he composed music with the voice of Ahmad Shamlou.

Babak Bayat continued the soundtrack of the film after the revolution with the film Death of Yazdgerd by Bahram Beizai. In 1983, he made music for the films Weaknesses and Roots in the Blood, and in the following years for the films Maybe another time by Bahram Beizai, the series Sultan and the Shepherd, Angelica Wrestling, The Last Curtain, Talisman, Mercedes, Jahan Pahlavan Takhti, Red, Two Women, and wrote about 90 film musics.

Babak Bayat trained many singers, including Mohammad Esfahani, Hami, Mani Rahnama, and Nima Masiha. He has composed many songs with the words of songwriters such as Iraj Jannati Ataei, Babak Sahraei and with the voices of singers such as Dariush, Moein, Ebi, Aref, Sattar and Googoosh. He also taught film music at Tehran universities for eight years.

== Honors and awards ==
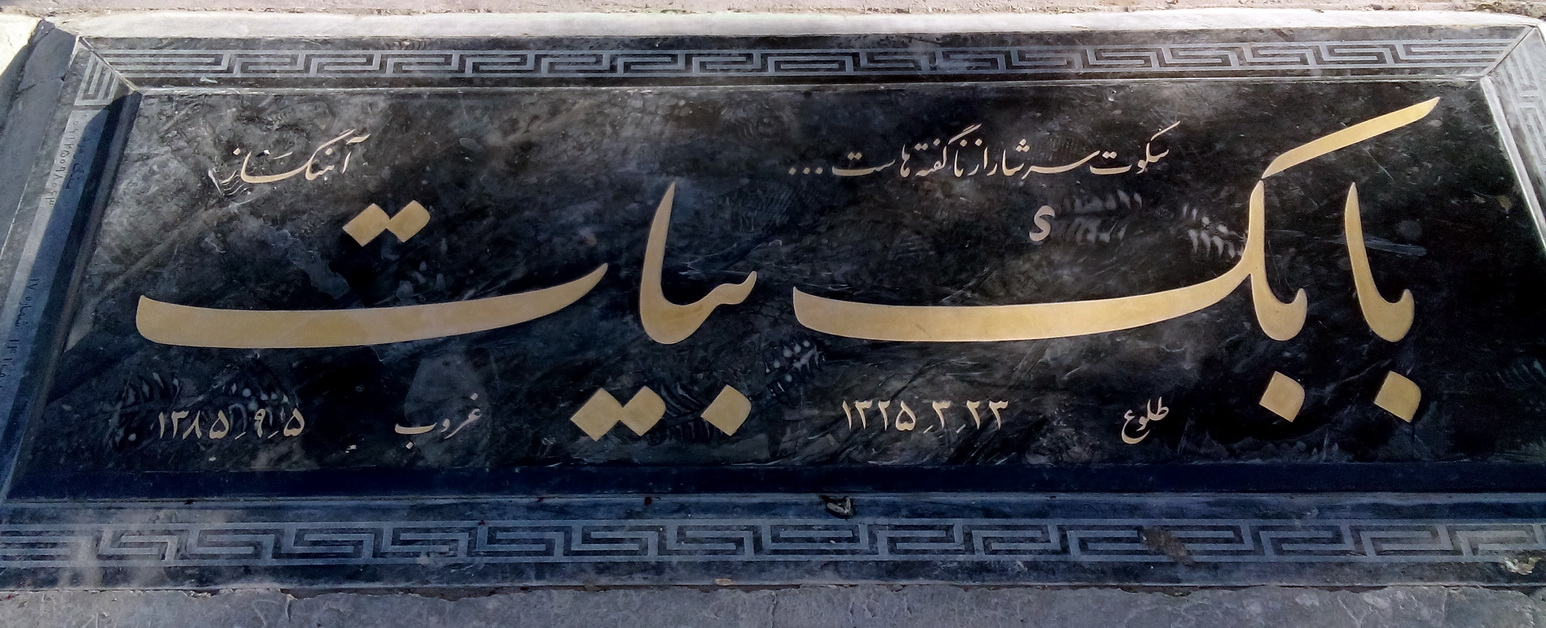
Babak Bayat Tomb

Babak Bayat has received many awards and nominations in his career. The Cinema House Festival awarded him first prize for film music, for his work on The Witch. He was also given the award for best composer on the centenary of cinema. The majority of Bayat's awards, however, come from the Fajr International Film Festival. From this festival, he has received all of the following awards and nominations:

| Year | Category | Nominated work | Result | Ref. |
|---|---|---|---|---|
| 1986 | Crystal Simorgh Best Soundtrack | Talisman | Nominated | |
| 1987 | Crystal Simorgh Best Soundtrack | Hunting | Nominated | |
| 1987 | Crystal Simorgh Best Soundtrack | Maybe Another Time | Nominated | |
| 1991 | Crystal Simorgh Best Soundtrack | Bride | Won | |
| 1991 | Crystal Simorgh Best Soundtrack | The Last Curtain | Nominated | |
| 1991 | Crystal Simorgh Best Soundtrack | Passengers | Nominated | |
| 1991 | Crystal Simorgh Best Soundtrack | Two Movies With One Ticket | Nominated | |
| 1993 | Crystal Simorgh Best Soundtrack | Angel Day | Nominated | |
| 1994 | Crystal Simorgh Best Soundtrack | Naughty Day | Nominated | |
| 1997 | Crystal Simorgh Best Soundtrack | Land of the Sun | Won | |
| 1997 | Crystal Simorgh Best Soundtrack | A Man Like Rain | Won | |
| 1998 | Crystal Simorgh Best Soundtrack | Mercedes | Nominated | |
| 1999 | Crystal Simorgh Best Soundtrack | Red | Nominated | |

== Death ==
Babak Bayat died on 26 November 2006, due to liver failure and was buried in the Behesht Zahra artists' section.

In the third edition of the Persian Music Salnava Ceremony, commemoration of 4 deceased artists was held, including "Babak Bayat", and his family was thanked by donating a memorial statue. This ceremony was held in November 2017 in the Persian Gulf Hall of the Niavaran Artistic Creations Foundation. Bayat's sons, Barbad and Bamdad are both composer.
