= Moein (singer) =

Iranian singer (born 1952)

- Moein in 2025

Background information
- Born: Nasrollah Moein Najafabadi; 20 January 1952 (age 74); Najafabad, Isfahan, Iran
- Genres: Iranian pop music Persian traditional music
- Occupation: Singer
- Years active: 1970–present
- Labels: Paricheh Avaz Company, Taraneh Records, MZM, Avang Music, Radio Javan, Caltex Records

Nasrollah Moein Najafabadi (Persian: نصرالله معین نجف‌آبادی, romanized: Nasrollâh Moein Najafâbâdi, born 19 January 1952), known professionally as Moein (معین, Persian pronunciation: [moˈ(ʔ)in]), is an Iranian singer of pop and traditional music. He began his career in pre-revolutionary Iran, and immigrated to the United States following the 1979 Iranian Revolution.

== Early life ==
Moein, born Nasrollah Moein Najafabadi on Sunday, 19 January 1952, in Najafabad, Isfahan Province, grew up in a religious, middle-class, and large family, being the seventh child. During his youth, he recited the Quran and performed classical Persian poetry by renowned poets. Alongside friends, he held numerous performances in his hometown and other cities in Isfahan Province. His passion for singing emerged in childhood, and he began his career as a radio singer, quickly gaining widespread attention for his voice. From 1970 to 1978, he performed at Radio Isfahan, the Shah Abbas Hotel in Isfahan, and the Thousand and One Nights Cabaret.

== Career ==
In 1978, Moein released his debut single, Yeki Ra Doost Midaram, in Tehran, with lyrics by Masoud Amini (introductory vocals by Iraj Baghaei Kermani) and music composed by Moein himself. The song became an instant hit, transcending Iran's borders and being covered by other Iranian singers who had immigrated to the U.S. post-revolution, including Hayedeh, Aref, and Ebi. This track propelled Moein to fame overnight, establishing him as a prominent vocalist. In recent years, Moein has enjoyed significant popularity in Iran and has performed concerts worldwide, earning the title "eternal voice of love."

Moein’s professional career in the United States began in the early 1980s. In 1983, he released his debut solo album, Miparastam, through Taraneh Records. Throughout his career, he has collaborated with distinguished Iranian pop music composers, including Anoushiravan Rohani, Sadegh Nojouki, Mohammad Heydari, Jahanshakh Pazouki, Kazem Alemi, Hassan Shamaizadeh, Manouchehr Cheshmazar, Farid Zoland, Andranik, Siavash Ghomayshi, and Babak Bayat. He has also worked with prominent lyricists such as Leila Kasra, Homa Mirafshar, Masoud Amini, Ardalan Sarfaraz, Shahyar Ghanbari, Masoud Fardmanesh, Homayoun Hoshiyarnejad, Jacqueline, and Zoya Zakarian, and has performed duets with Hayedeh.

Moein’s collaboration with renowned composer Sadegh Nojouki resulted in albums such as Naneh (Be To Miandisham) and Khatereh 7, featuring popular tracks like Tanaz and Arbab-e Vafa, which significantly boosted his popularity.

In 1986, Moein released Kaabeh, which became the best-selling album of the year. He and Hayedeh formed a successful artistic duo, producing the best-selling album of 1987, Golhay-e Ghorbat 1. Among his notable performances is a 1992 concert at the Universal Amphitheatre in Los Angeles, led by Andranik.

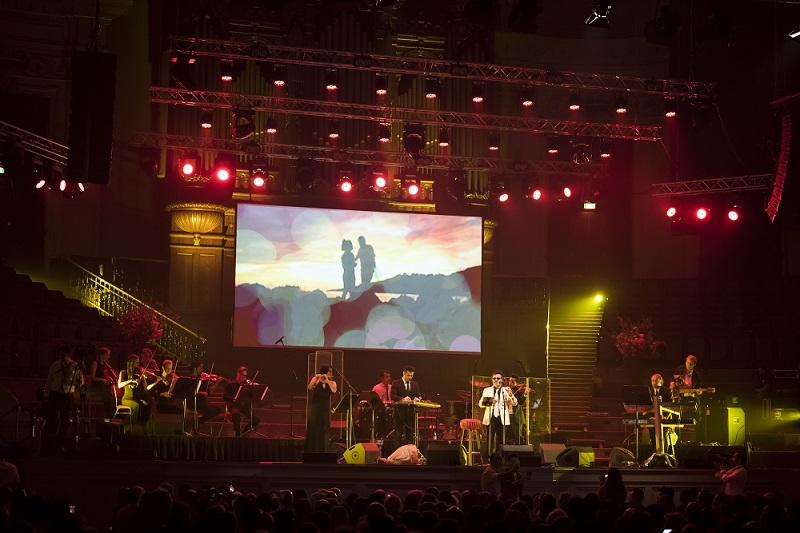
Moein in Concert, Khaba - Amsterdam

In 2000, Moein released the album Parvaz, followed by the successful Lahzeha in 2002, collaborating with artists such as Hassan Shamaizadeh, Homa Mirafshar, and Babak Radmanesh. Standout tracks from Lahzeha include Lahzeha, Faramoosham Nakon, Ghasam Nakhor, and Shabay-e Raftan-e To. After a five-year hiatus, he released Tolo in the fall of 2007, working with Babak Bayat, Babak Sahraei, Fazlollah Tavakol, Sadegh Nojouki, and Kazem Alemi. Following this, Moein released several singles, including Khatereh, Hamdam, Shomal, and Khouneh-ye Arezoo. After a 12-year gap since his last album, he released Mandegar on 20 January 2019, collaborating with lyricists and composers such as Afshin Moghaddam, Afshin Yadollahi, Roozbeh Bemani, Homa Mirafshar, Babak Zarrin, Mohammad Heydari, and Fazlollah Tavakol. Mandegar remains his latest album.

He began his artistic career as a radio singer and released several albums before Miparastam in 1983, which was his first album to be widely noticed in Iran. The name of this album was Ghazal. In recent years, Moein has become widely acclaimed in Iran and he has played concerts all around the globe. He is referred to as "Javdan Sedaye Eshgh," which translates to "The Eternal Voice of Love". Moein has a strange skill in presenting romantic and sad works, which is related to the burning and sadness hidden in his voice.

The song Safar (beginning with “Safar kardam ke az yadam beri, didam nemishe…”), composed by Farid Zoland with lyrics by Leila Kasra, is one of Moein’s notable works. Director Mostafa Kiai drew inspiration from this song for his film Anti-Bullet, which tells the story of a man whose life is transformed by Moein’s rendition of the track.

In 1986, Moein collaborated with Hayedeh, Mahasti, and Anoushiravan Rohani on the album Sal, performing the tracks Havas and Avaz-e Jodaei. He later worked with Hayedeh and Mohammad Heydari on Golhay-e Ghorbat 1, performing Delam Gereft. In 1988, he joined a group of Iranian singers in Los Angeles to perform Tanin-e Solh, composed by Farrokh Ahi with lyrics by Leila Kasra, to mark the end of the Iran-Iraq War.

In 2012, Siavash Ghomayshi composed Parandeh, which he recorded as a duet with Moein for the first time in his career.

== Personal life ==
In 1989, at the age of 38, Moein married a Spanish woman and released the album Sobhet Bekheyr Azizam that same year. In 1991, their daughter, Paricheh (meaning "little fairy"), was born.

In 1995, Moein separated from his wife and lived alone with his young daughter for a period, during which he recorded Baba (Cheshmat-o Va Kon o Bebin), inspired by his daughter’s separation from her mother. In 1999, he married his second wife, an Iranian woman named Pantea, with whom he has a daughter named Setareh. Moein currently resides in Encino, Los Angeles.

On 9 January 2024, Mohammad Mehdi Esmaili, Iran’s Minister of Culture and Islamic Guidance, responded to a journalist’s question about Moein’s potential activities in Iran, stating, “Their presence in Iran is not an issue; permission to perform is a separate matter, governed by the law. The same rules apply to them as to anyone else.”

Hassan Shamaizadeh, quoting Moein from a phone conversation, claimed that Moein had dismissed the possibility of returning to Iran.

== Discography ==
=== Studio albums ===
- Miparastam (1983)
- Arezo (1984)
- Havas (1985)
- Kabeh (1986)
- Golhaye Ghorbat (With Hayedeh) (1987)
- Safar (1987)
- Bi Bi Gol (1988)
- Sobhet Bekheir Azizam (1989)
- Isfahan (With Faezeh) (1990)
- Be To Miandisham (1991)
- Namaz (1992)
- Khatereh 7 (With Shohreh) (1992)
- Tavalod-e Eshgh (1994)
- Mosafer (1994)
- Panjereh (1997)
- Moama (1998)
- Parvaz (2000)
- Lahzeha (2002)
- Tolou (2007)
- Maandegar (2020)

=== Singles ===
- "Khatereha" (2010)
- "Hamdam" (2011)
- "Bachehaye Alborz" (Khoone Siavash) (2011)
- "Delam Tangete" (2012)
- "Majnoon" (2012)
- "Mardom" (2012)
- "Gole Naz Darom" (2013)
- "Parandeh" (featuring Siavash Ghomayshi) (2013)
- "Aghoosh" (2013)
- "Tarkam Nakon" (2013)
- "Havaye khooneh" (2014)
- "Be To Madyoonam" (2014)
- "To Ke Tamoome Donyami" (2014)
- "Shomal" (2015)
- "Atashe Del" (2015)
- "Ashegh Ke Beshi" (2015)
- "Bi To Nemitoonam" (2016)
- "Che Sali Beshe Emsal" (2016)
- "Kenare To" (2017)
- "Jane Man" (2017)
- "Delam Tangete" (Live Version) (2017)
- "Divoonegi Nakon" (2017)
- "Sange Khara" (2018)
- "Shoghe Safar" (2018)
- "Khooneye Arezoo" (2018)
- "Haminjoori Nemimoone" (2019)
- "Ba Man Bemoon" (2019)
- "Be Didane Man Bia" (Live Version) (2019)
- "Ka'abeh" (Live Version) (2019)
- "Divaneh Miraghsad" (2021)
- "Elaheye Naaz" (Unplugged Version) (2021)
- "Hamdam" (Unplugged Version) (2021)
- "Faghat To" (2022)
- "Havas" (Live Version) (2022)
- "Adamiat" (2023)
- "Naro" (2023)
- "World Tour Fall (Live Long Version) (2023)":
- "Be To Miandisham"
- "Tanhatarin Mard"
- "Hamseda"
- "Tannaz"
- "Zendegi Ba To"
- "Siah Cheshmoon"
- "Ye Eshareh"
- "Ba To" (2024)
- "Maghsood Toei" (2025)
