= Caltex Records =

American record label

- Parent company: Caltex Music
- Founded: 1979
- Founder: Mehrdad Pakravan
- Distributor: Caltex Music
- Genre: Iranian, Persian
- Country of origin: United States
- Location: Los Angeles, California
- Official website: www.caltexrecords.com www.caltexmusic.com

Caltex Records (Persian: کلتکس رکوردز) is an American record label based in Los Angeles, California. Founded in 1979 by Iranian American Mehrdad Pakravan, the label represents most of the mainstream Iranian songs released since the 1950s.

Caltex Records represents hundreds of artists across a wide range of genres, including pop, hip-hop, electronic, dance, rock, folk, jazz, classical, instrumental, R&B, and funk. In addition to representing classic artists, Caltex Records has a large catalogue of new music from emerging artists. The label caters to a large population of Iranian listeners living abroad.

Caltex Records is one of four divisions under the Caltex Music umbrella: CTX Publishing (publishing arm), Caltex Worldwide Music (publishing arm), and Tanin Television (television network).

== Notable artists ==
Artists and groups who have recorded with Caltex Records include:

- Akbar Golpayegani
- Andranik Madadian
- Andy & Kouros
- Aref Arefkia
- Ayşegül Coşkun
- Bijan Mortazavi
- Black Cats
- Dariush Eghbali
- Delkash
- Ebi
- Elaheh
- Erfan
- Faramarz Aslani
- Fereydoun Farrokhzad
- Gholam-Hossein Banan
- Giti
- Googoosh
- Hassan Sattar
- Hassan Shamaizadeh
- Hayedeh
- Homeyra
- Kourosh Yaghmaei
- Leila Forouhar
- Mahasti
- Mehrdad Asemani
- Mansour
- Martik
- Marzieh
- Moein
- Mohammad Nouri
- Mohammadreza Shajarian
- Mohammad-Reza Lotfi
- Morteza Barjesteh
- Octave (musician)
- Pooran
- Pyruz
- Ramesh
- Sami Beigi
- Sandy
- Sepideh
- Shahram Shabpareh
- Shahrokh
- Shahrum K
- Shakila
- Shohreh Solati
- Siavash Ghomayshi
- Siavash Shams
- Susan Roshan
- Toofan
- Viguen

== Associated labels and imprints ==
- CTX Publishing
- Tanin Television

== See also ==
- List of record labels
