= Bahador Kharazmi =

Iranian singer (born 1984)

- Bahador in Dubai ClubMix 2006

Background information
- Birth name: Amir Bahador Kharazmi
- Also known as: Bahador Kharazmi
- Born: May 7, 1984 (age 41)
- Origin: Tehran, Iran
- Genres: Synthpop, Dance, Electro House, Electronica
- Occupation(s): Singer/songwriter, record producer
- Instrument(s): Vocals, Guitar, Piano, Tom-Back, Daf, Setar, Violin, Synthesizer
- Years active: 1998–present
- Labels: Avang Music
- Website: bahadorkharazmi.com

Amir Bahador Kharazmi (Persian: امیر بهادر خوارزمی, born May 7, 1984) better known by his stage name Bahador Kharazmi is an Iranian Singer-Songwriter and Record producer who started his career as an underground music producer after the Iranian Revolution in which music was considered Haram and all forms of popular music were banned. In 2003 his single the cover of an old Persian Song, "Too In Zamoone (Vay Vay)", which was unofficially released on his weblog was well-received among the Persian community and became a successful release for him and earned him a record deal with a major label in the United States, Avang Music. The album was internationally published and released in 2004. Since the late 1990s, Bahador has become one of the major contributors to forming the underground music movement in Iran.

== Life and career ==
=== Childhood and youth ===
He was born in Tehran capital of Iran in a musical family.

=== Career: 1998 – 2006 ===
Bahador started his musical career as an underground music producer at the age of 15 and was first introduced to the Persian Community through an underground musical contest held by Tehran Avenue with his song "Khooneye Madar Bozorgeh". Bahador's debut concert was held in Dubai on 2006 and was a successful start for his career.

=== Career: 2007 – present ===
Due to restrictions forced upon Iranian artists inside of Iran and performing outside of Iran, Bahador decided to terminate his connections with companies located outside of Iran and has focused on digitally releasing his songs on his website, but in 2013 Bahador restarted working on his music in the United States seeking the chance to freely promote his music and released his first single "Jaddeye Eshgh" away from Iran in November 2013. In October 2013, 9 years after the release of his debut album in the U.S., Bahador performed his first concert in the United States at the Yost Theater in Santa Ana, California.

== Discography ==
=== Studio albums ===
- Too in Zamoone (2004)
- The Secrecy of Silence (2013)

=== Singles ===
- Perfect World (August 12, 1998)
- Gole Goldoon (October 18, 1999)
- Zemestoon (May 5, 2000)
- Khatteh Ghermez (November 28, 2001)
- Khooneye Madarbozorge (April 11, 2003)
- Too in Zamoone (July 11, 2003)
- Gole Sangam (December 4, 2003)
- Yahoo (March 23, 2007)
- Fate (May 24, 2009)
- SiyahBakht (August 30, 2010)
- Ghesseyeh Eshgh (March 13, 2011)
- Tanasokh (Reincarnation) (May 15, 2012)
- Jaddeye Eshgh (November 13, 2013)

== See also ==
- Music of Iran
- Persian pop music
- List of Iranian musicians
