= Shahram Shabpareh =

Iranian pop singer and songwriter (born 1948)

Shahram Shabpareh شهرام شب‌پره
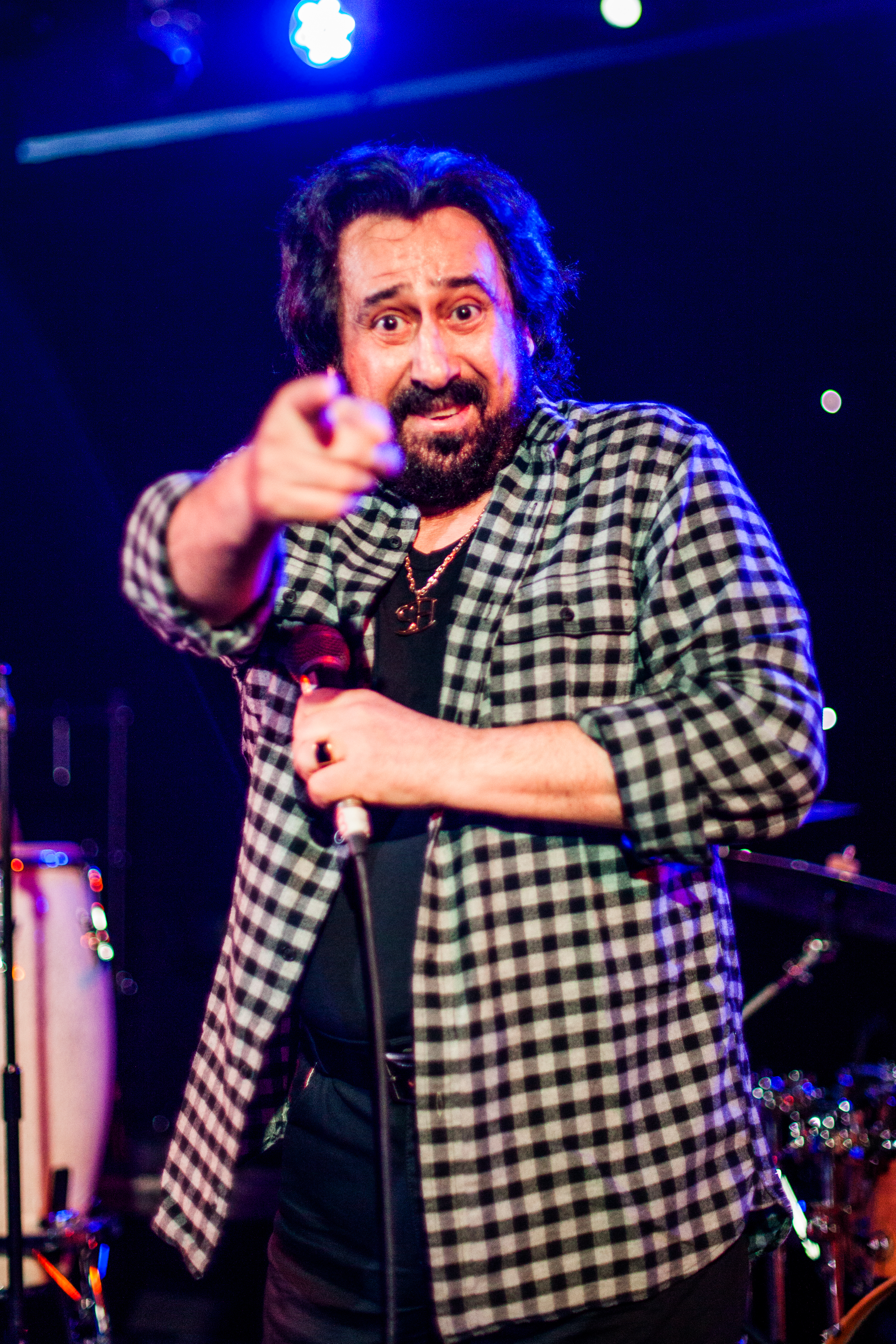
- Shabpareh in March 2018

Background information
- Also known as: "The King of Persian Pop Music"
- Born: 6 February 1948 (age 78); Tehran, Imperial State of Iran
- Genres: Pop; dance; rock
- Occupations: Singer; songwriter; composer; actor
- Instruments: Guitar; electric guitar; bass guitar; keyboard; piano; drums
- Years active: 1964–2023
- Labels: Taraneh Records; Caltex Records; Avang Records; Pars Video; MZM Records; Tapesh Records
- Formerly of: Black Cats
- Website: instagram.com/shahrame_shabpareh/

Shahram Shabpareh (Persian: شهرام شب‌پره; born 6 February 1948) is an Iranian singer, songwriter, composer, and actor. He is a pioneer of Iranian pop music, having begun his career in the 1960s. Alongside his brother Shahbal Shabpareh, he co-founded the music group Black Cats. Shabpareh also appeared in several films and, following the 1979 Iranian Revolution, immigrated to Los Angeles, where he continued his career. As a producer and composer, he has collaborated with prominent Iranian artists, including Shohreh Solati, Ebi, Siavash Ghomayshi, Sattar, Googoosh, Leila Forouhar, Shahram Solati, and Andy.

In July 2023, during his final concert, Shabpareh announced his retirement from the music industry.

== Early life ==
Shahram Shabpareh was born on 6 February 1948 in Tehran, Iran. His father, Mohammad Shabpareh, was a retired army colonel. Shahram’s older brother, Shahbal Shabpareh, is also a musician. Shahram began his musical career in 1961 as a drummer.

He launched his professional career as a singer in the summer of 1964, at the age of 17, performing at Motel Ghoo in Salman Shahr, northern Iran, with a band. That same year, he co-founded the band The Rebels alongside Siavash Ghomayshi, Homayoun Jamali, and Kambiz Moeini.

== Departure from Iran ==
Before the 1979 Iranian Revolution, Shahram Shabpareh immigrated from Iran with Shohreh Solati. He currently resides in Los Angeles, California. Over the course of his career, he has released more than 20 albums and, after over five decades of professional activity, remains a highly popular and acclaimed artist in Iran.

In September 2024, Shabpareh claimed in an interview with Kambiz Hosseini on Iran International that he married Ramesh in a bid to assist her with her move to the United States, even though she was a lesbian.

== Career ==
He started his career as a drum player in the early 1960s when he was 13. In the mid-1960s at the age of 17, he formed a band of his own named "Rebels".

He was a member of Black Cats from 1964 to 1979, which was started by his brother Shahbal Shabpareh. He embarked a solo career starting in the 70s.

After the Islamic Revolution in 1979, Shahram, who had migrated to California a few years earlier, did not have the opportunity to return to his homeland. Since then, he has been living in the United States.

With a career spanning 50 years, he is among popular artists in Iranian society and his concerts are well received by Iranians all over the world. He is a judge on Persian Talent Show.

== Collaborations ==
Shahram Shabpareh has collaborated with numerous prominent Iranian singers, including Shohreh Solati, Shahram Solati, Ebi, Siavash Ghomayshi, Farhad Mehrad, Sattar, Googoosh, Leila Forouhar, Shahrokh, Nahid, Sharareh, Andy, and Kouros. In addition to releasing his own albums, he has played a significant role in identifying and introducing new talent to Iranian pop music.

Artists such as Pirouz, Nahid, Andy, and Kouros gained recognition in Los Angeles through their association with Shahram Shabpareh, leveraging his guidance to develop their careers. Ebrahim Hamedi (Ebi) also began his collaboration with Shabpareh and the Black Cats band following a chance encounter at the Hilton Hotel.

== Recognition ==
In honor of over half a century of contributions to Iranian pop music, often referred to as the "leading man of Iranian pop music", BBC Persian hosted a special program for the 2025 Nowruz celebration titled Nowruz Celebration 1404 with Shahram Shabpareh. Hosted by Shohreh Aghdashloo, the program invited music enthusiasts to perform covers of Shabpareh's songs. The program featured 15 of Shabpareh's songs.

== Discography ==
=== Studio albums ===
Year	Album	Label / Notes
2012	Taar Taa Geetaar	Avang Music
2008	Tapesh	
2005	Fire	
2001	Donya	
1999	Didar	
1998	Rhythm of the Night	
1995	Do Rahi	
1995	Story	
1994	Summer of 94	
1992	Summer of 92	
1991	Shagerde Aval	
1988	Khejalati	
1987	Bagheh Alephba	
1986	Shaparak	
1985	Madreseh (Pariyah)	
1984	Telesm	
1983	Khodaya Che Konam?	
1982	Iran Iran	
1981	Mosafer	
1980	Hich Koja Iran Nemisheh	
1980	Deyar	
1999	Gorg-o Bareh	℗ 1999 Taraneh Enterprises Inc
1978	Rock & Roll	

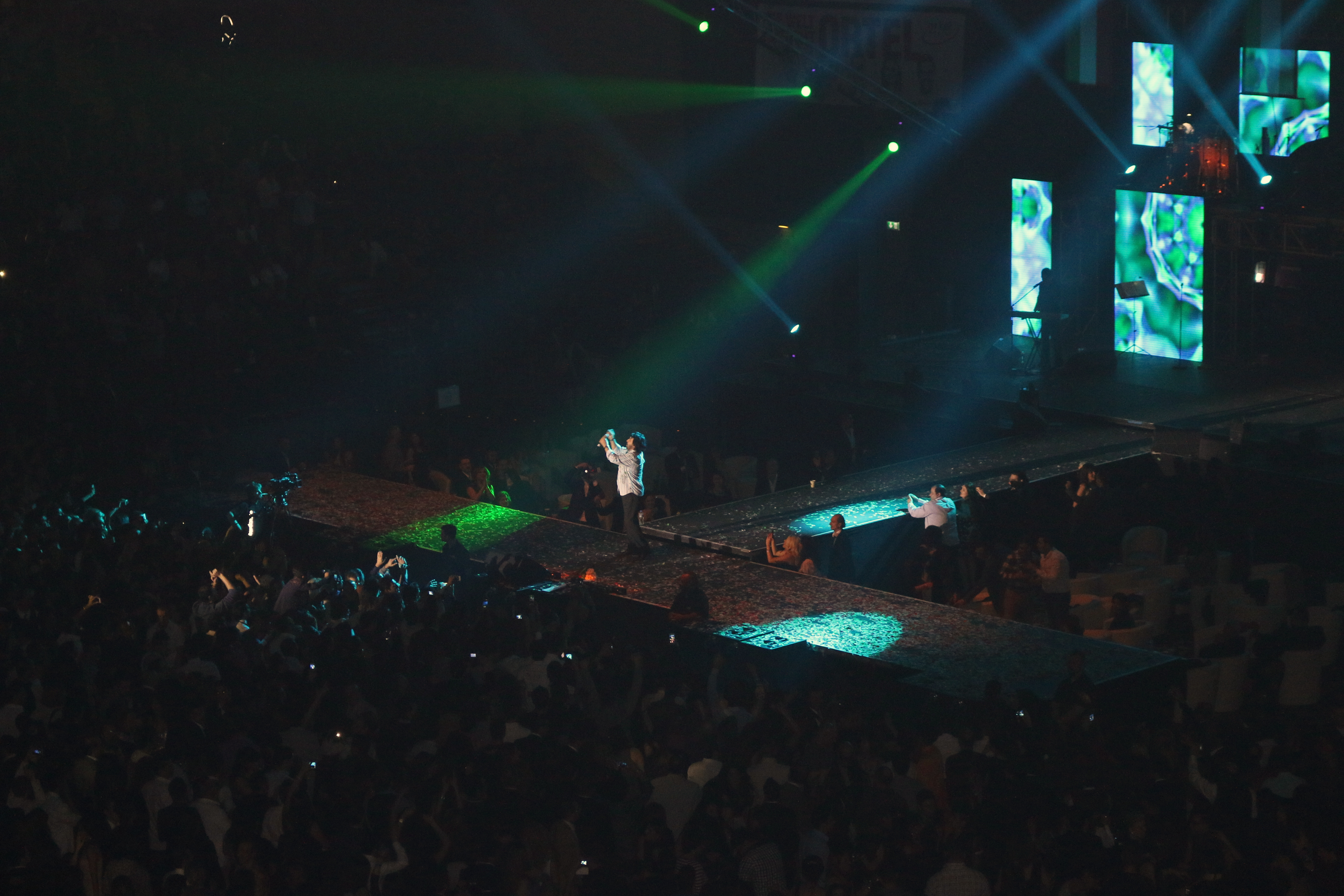
Shahram Shabpareh in a Persian New Year Concert, Arena Oberhausen, March 2014

== Filmography ==
Year	Film
1978	Booye Gandom
1977	Mahiha Dar Khak Mimirand
1976	Alafhaye Harz
1975	Shabe Ghariban
1974	Aroose Dejleh
