= Shohreh (singer) =

Iranian singer

Shohreh شهره
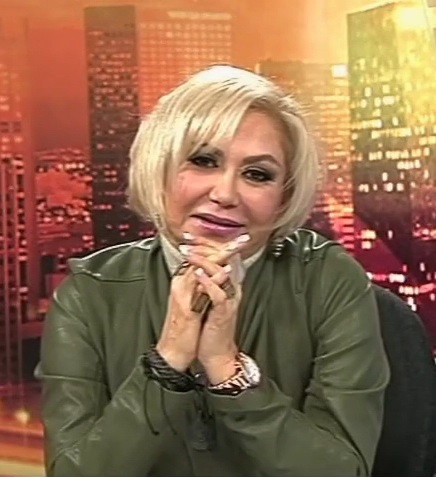
- Solati during an interview with VOA, September 2016

Background information
- Born: Fatemeh Solati; January 4, 1959 (age 67)
- Genres: Pop; dance; Persian traditional
- Occupation: Singer
- Years active: 1965–present
- Labels: Caltex Records; Avang Records; Nava Media; Taraneh Records; Power Records
- Website: shohrehsolati.com

Fatemeh Solati (Persian: فاطمه صولتی, born January 4, 1959), better known as Shohreh (شهره), is an Iranian singer. With nearly 50 years in the pop music industry, she has released 32 albums and performed approximately 300 songs. She is the younger sister of Shahram Solati, another Iranian singer.

Shohreh was born in the Sar Cheshmeh neighborhood of Tehran. At the age of seven, she discovered her passion for music and, with her family’s support, attended the National Conservatory of Music, where she studied voice, piano, flute, and clarinet.

== Career ==
=== Pre-Revolution ===
At 15, Shohreh developed an interest in artistic pursuits. Her debut song, Dokhtar-e Mashreghi, with lyrics by Mansour Tehrani and music by Mohammad Shams, marked her entry into the music scene. She gained prominence with the song To Ke Nisti, composed by Arash Sezavar. Following her entry into pop music, she secured contracts with companies, and her image appeared on the covers of weekly magazines. Before the Iranian Revolution, she collaborated with composers such as Mohammad Shams, Parviz Maghsadi, Babak Bayat, Amir Aram, Siavash Ghomeyshi, Arash Sezavar, and Fereydoun Khoshnoud, as well as arrangers like Eric Arcont and Andranik. She also appeared multiple times on Fereydoun Farrokhzad’s television show Mikhak-e Nogreh.

Shohreh also pursued a cinematic career, acting alongside Dariush in the film Faryad Zire Ab. She recorded a song titled Shabgard with Dariush for the unfinished film Badam-haye Talkh, which was later released independently after the film’s cancellation. In 1977, she co-hosted a television show called Setareh-ye Baran with Saeed Kangarani.

In September 1978, before the Islamic Revolution, Shohreh traveled to the United States for a concert with Shahram Shabpareh and remained there due to the political changes in Iran. She initially stayed in New York before relocating to Los Angeles.

=== Post-Revolution ===
==== Marriage ====
After the revolution, Shohreh remained in the United States and married Khosrow Naybi. They had a daughter named Tannaz, but the marriage ended in divorce, and Shohreh did not remarry.

==== Works in the 1980s, 1990s, and 2000s ====
Shohreh is recognized as one of the most prolific and highest-earning female Iranian singers, having performed around 300 songs and released 32 albums, both solo and collaborative. Over the past five decades, she has been one of the most influential figures in Iranian pop music and among the most popular female singers in the 1980s, 1990s, and 2000s.

===== 1980s =====
Her first song recorded in Los Angeles, Sargashteh, featured lyrics by Rumi and music and arrangement by Babak Afshar. Albums such as Telesm, Salam, Sheytoonak, Yeki Yekdooneh, and Marmar were released during this decade. Memorable songs from this period include Tolo, Salam, Aroosi, Sheytoonak, Kalaagh-e Dom-Siah, Shab-e She’r, and Yeki Yekdooneh. During this time, she collaborated with prominent Iranian composers like Hassan Shamaizadeh, Siavash Ghomeyshi, Manouchehr Cheshmazar, and Sadegh Nojouki, as well as lyricists such as Masoud Amini, Bijan Samandar, and Leila Kasra, and arrangers including Manouchehr Cheshmazar, Sadegh Nojouki, and Abdi Yamini.

===== 1990s =====
The 1990s marked the peak of the “six-and-eight” (shish-o-hasht) music style, with Shohreh, alongside Shahram Shabpareh, Hassan Shamaizadeh, Moein, and Andy, being among the leading artists in this genre. Her popular song Aksasho Paareh Kardam was released during this period. Shohreh reached the height of her career with upbeat six-and-eight songs. Albums such as Seda-ye Pa, Hamnafas, Jomeh be Jomeh, Mehman, Panjereha, and Sayeh-ye Shoma featured her mega-hit songs. These albums were composed by Sadegh Nojouki, Mohammad Moghadam, Hassan Shamaizadeh, Farid Zoland, and Mehrdad Asemani, with lyrics by Masoud Fardmanesh, Homa Mirafshar, Homayoun Hoshiyarnejad, and Ardalan Sarfaraz, and arrangements by Sadegh Nojouki, Mohammad Moghadam, and Manouchehr Cheshmazar.

===== 2000s =====
In the 2000s, Shohreh moved away from the six-and-eight style, focusing on slower, trance, techno, and house music genres. Sadegh Nojouki’s name no longer appeared in her works, with Jacqueline becoming her primary composer. During this decade, she released five albums: Atr, Safar, Pishooni, Havas, and Ashegham, with contributions from composers Jacqueline, Mohammad Moghadam, Farid Zoland, and Mehrdad Asemani, lyricists Jacqueline, Masoud Fardmanesh, and Ardalan Sarfaraz, and arrangers Farid Zoland, Mohammad Moghadam, Schubert Avakian, and Shahyad. Manouchehr Cheshmazar, prominent in her 1980s and 1990s works, contributed to only five arrangements in this decade.

===== 2010s to present =====
During this period, Shohreh did not release any albums, as the focus in the 2010s shifted to singles rather than full albums. Los Angeles-based composers, lyricists, and arrangers were no longer prominent in her work. Instead, she collaborated with young, enthusiastic Iranian composers based in Iran. From 2009 to the present, she has recorded 40 singles.

== Controversies ==
=== Performance of Kalaagh-e Dom-Siah ===
In 2019, a video surfaced of a woman named Negar Moazzam performing Shohreh's song Kalaagh-e Dom-Siah during a tourism tour in the village of Abyaneh. The video went viral on social media, with users describing it as one of the "beauties of Iran".

However, it provoked negative reactions from judicial authorities and traditional clerics. Moazzam was summoned by the Natanz Public and Revolutionary Prosecutor's Office and sentenced to one year in prison for "unauthorized singing". Later, after the prosecutor declared her a fugitive, Moazzam appeared on stage with Shohreh in Turkey, performing Kalaagh-e Dom-Siah and several other songs together.

== Discography ==
- 1976: Dokhtar-e-Mashreghi
- 1984: Telesm (with Shahram Shabpareh)
- 1987: Salam
- 1987: Sheytoonak
- 1989: Yeki Yekdooneh (with Shahram Solati)
- 1990: Mix
- 1990: Marmar (with Dariush Eghbali, Ebi, and Farzin)
- 1991: Gereftar
- 1991: Sedaye Paa
- 1992: Khatereh 7 (with Moein)
- 1992: Ham Nafas
- 1993: Jaan Jaan
- 1993: Sekeh Tala (with Shahram Solati and Hassan)
- 1993: Mehmoon' (with Martik)
- 1994: Panjereha (with Shahram Solati)
- 1994: Zan
- 1996: Joomeh Be Joomeh
- 1996: Nemizaram Beri (with Shahram Solati and Hassan Sattar)
- 1996: Ghesseh Goo
- 1996: Love Songs 1
- 1999: Aksaasho Paareh Kardam
- 1999: Sayeh
- 2000: Hekayat 5 (with Masoud Fardmanesh)
- 2001: Atr
- 2002: Safar
- 2003: Pishooni
- 2004: Yaram Koo? (with Faramarz Aslani and Siavash Ghomeishi)
- 2005: Havas
- 2008: Ashegham

Shohreh's Top Songs (Zirishk Poll 2006)
RANK	SONG	ALBUM	YEAR
1	Dokhtar-e-Mashreghi	Dokhtar-e-Mashreghi	1976
2	Tab	Ghessehgoo	1996
3	Ghessehgoo I & II	Ghessehgoo	1996
4	Ayeneh	Panjereha	1994
5	Aksasho Pare Kardam	Sedaye Pa	1991
6	Peyghaam	Sayeh	1999
7	Safar	Safar	2002
8	Sar Beh Hava	Havas	2005
9	Gharibeh Aashegh	Mehmoon	1993
10	Nasoozi	Sayeh	1999
11	Atish	Pishooni	2003
12	Ayeneh	Zan	1994
13	Salam	Salam	1985
14	Bemiram	Ham Nafas	1992
15	Boghz	Safar	2002
