= Iraj Janatie Ataie =

Iraj Janatie Ataie ایرج جنتی عطایی
- Birth name: Iraj Janatie Ataie
- Born: January 9, 1947; Mashhad, Iran
- Occupation(s): Poet, Lyricist, Playwright, Theatre Director
- Website: www.janatie-ataie.com

Iraj Janatie Ataie, also romanized as "Īraj Jannatī `Atāyī" (b. 9 January, 1947 in Mashhad; Persian: ایرج جنتی عطایی) is a critically and popularly acclaimed Iranian poet, lyricist, playwright and theatre director. He is best known for his collaborations with Ebi, Googoosh, and Dariush.

Janatie Ataie graduated from the Drama School of Tehran University and studied art sociology in Chelsea College of Art and Design.

== See also ==
- Shahyar Ghanbari
