= Avang Music =

Iranian-American record label

- Parent company: Avang Records, Inc.
- Founded: 1995
- Founder: Mahin Abadani
- Distributor: Avang Music
- Genre: Persian Music
- Country of origin: Iran; United States
- Location: Playa Vista, Los Angeles, California
- Official website: www.avang.com

Avang Music (Persian: آونگ lit. Pendulum) is an Iranian-American record label and TV channel based in Los Angeles, California. Avang Music is the parent company of Avang Records Inc, Avang TV, and Mystery4 Productions, which handles all the live events and concerts organized by Avang Music.

The company has produced and distributed music from a wide range of genres, including pop, rock, classical, and traditional Persian music.

In addition to producing and distributing music, Avang Records Inc is responsible for producing and distributing music, while Avang TV broadcasts music videos, interviews, and other music-related content. Mystery4 Productions handles live events and concerts organized by Avang Music, and has organized concerts and shows featuring Persian music artists.

== Roster ==
Musicians signed to Avang Music:

- 25Band
- Ahllam
- Amir Farjam
- Amir Tataloo
- Afshin
- Andy
- Aref
- Ashkan Pooya
- Alex Ferra
- Aref Shakouri
- Baran
- Bahador Kharazmi
- Behrouz
- Black Cats
- Gheysar
- Hamid Rasti
- Hamid Sefat
- Hengameh
- Jamshid
- Keyvan
- Kamran & Hooman
- Ladan
- Mahsa Navi
- Maziar Ahmadi
- Mehrshad
- Nahal
- Omid
- Pooria Niakan
- Pouya
- Sepideh
- Saeed Kermani
- Shadmehr Aghili
- Shahrum Kashani
- Shahab Tiam
- Shahram Shabpareh
- Shahram Solati
- Shahyad
- Saeed Shayesteh
- Siavash Ghomayshi
- Shohreh
- Valy
- Ramiz King

== See also ==
Pars Video

Caltex Records

Taraneh Records
