= Sattar (singer) =

Iranian singer (born 1949)

Sattar ستار
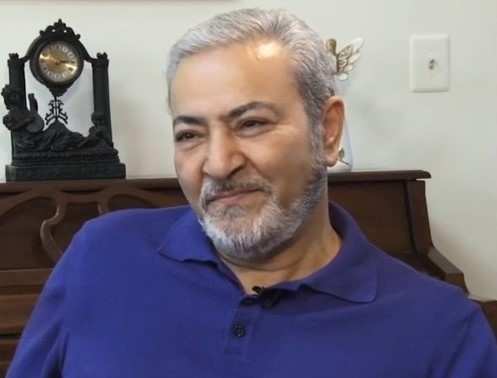
- Sattar in 2018

Background information
- Born: Abdolhassan Sattarpour; 19 November 1949 (age 77); Tehran, Imperial State of Iran
- Genre: Persian pop
- Occupation: Singer
- Years active: 1972–2021
- Labels: Taraneh; Caltex; Avang Records/Avang; MZM Records
- Website: sattarmusic.net

Abdolhassan Sattarpour (Persian: عبدالحسن ستارپور; born 19 November 1949), better known simply as Sattar (Persian: ستار), is an Iranian singer with specialization in both Persian pop and classical music.

He had gained fame before the Islamic Revolution and became a Pahlavi Royal Family court singer up until the political upheavals of the late 1970s. He left Iran in 1978 and has lived in the United States since then.

== Biography ==
Sattar is one of six siblings born to an Abadani mother and Azeri father. His fame began at the age of 22 with the release of the theme song "Khaneh Bedush" for Morad Barghi, a popular television show in Iran. The show made him an instant star. His next hit came with the TV series Ghesseye Eshq made by Mansour Poormand. His signature song is "Hamsafar". With over 40 years of fame, Sattar has over 70 hits which includes the internationally known song "Gol-e Sangam".

Sattar has recorded over 350 songs and is among the very few Persian singers who in addition to the diverse sound of Pop, perform both Persian traditional and classical music professionally. Sattar has also recorded a number of cover songs in English, such as "Feelings", "A time for us", "Speak softly, Love" and "I Believe".

Sattar is a vocalist, who won two Golden Lioness Awards from the World Academy of Arts, Literature, and Media – WAALM in 2005. He also received a Doctorate Honoris Causa in Music from IFSI Institute in London in 2004.

== Discography ==
=== Single tracks ===
- Khaneh Be Doosh (1972)
- Sab o Divar (1972)
- Shahre Gham (1972)
- Khouneh (1973)
- Hamsafar (1974)
- Boht (1975)
- Khab Nama (1977)
- Cheshmaye To (1977)
- Safar Name (1981)
- Khaste Az In Hame Goftan (1981)
- Gitar O Gole Sorkh (1986)
- Ba Man Yaran Begoo (1986) (other artist)
- Ey Del (1987)
- Gol Naz (1992)
- No Bahar (1993) (other artist)
- Zamin Larzid (1996) (other artist)
- United For Neda (2009) (with Morteza & Dariush)
- A Time For Us (2011) (with Leonardo Tajabadi)
- Speaks Softly, Love (2011)
- Simin Bari (2011) (solo)
- Simin Bari (2011) (with Ersin Faikzade)
- Morghe Sahar (2011)
- Gole Hasrat (2011) (New Version)
- Hamsafar (2011) (New Version)
- Shazdeye Ma (2011)
- I Believe (2012) (solo)
- I Believe (2012) (with Kaiko Kagawa)
- Feeling (2012)
- Gholo Gharar (2012) (Version 1)
- Gholo Gharar (2012) (Version 2)
- Shahbanoo (2012)
- Gomshodeh (2013)
- If You Go Away (2013)
- Dare to Live (2013)
- Medley (2013) (with Leila & Hamid Talebzadeh)
- Norooz (2013) (with Leila & Hamid Talebzadeh)
- Nasle Bi Setareh (2013)
- Parvanegi (2013)
- Baraye Ba To Boodan (2013)
- Taskin (2014)
- Eyde Shoma Mobarak (2014) (with Morteza)
- Hamsafar (2014) (with Kamyar)
- Yousefe Gomgashteh (2015) (New Version)
- Adat (2016)
- 40 Taraneh (2016)
- Bazam Bahar Resideh (2016)
- Ostureh (2016)
- Bebin Hala (2017)
- Shahzadeh (2017)
- Hamsafare Khatereha (2017)
- Del khoon (2017)
- Mojasameh (2017)
- Vatanam (2018)
- Khaterate Koodaki (2018)
- Shame Akhar (2018) (New Version)
- Adat (2019) (New Version)
- Bavaram Nemisheh (2019)
- Tavalode Bahar (2020)
- Zan (2020)
- Khonzestan (2021)
- Farghi Nemikone (2021)
- Ravi (2021)
- Inja Kojast (2021)

=== Albums ===
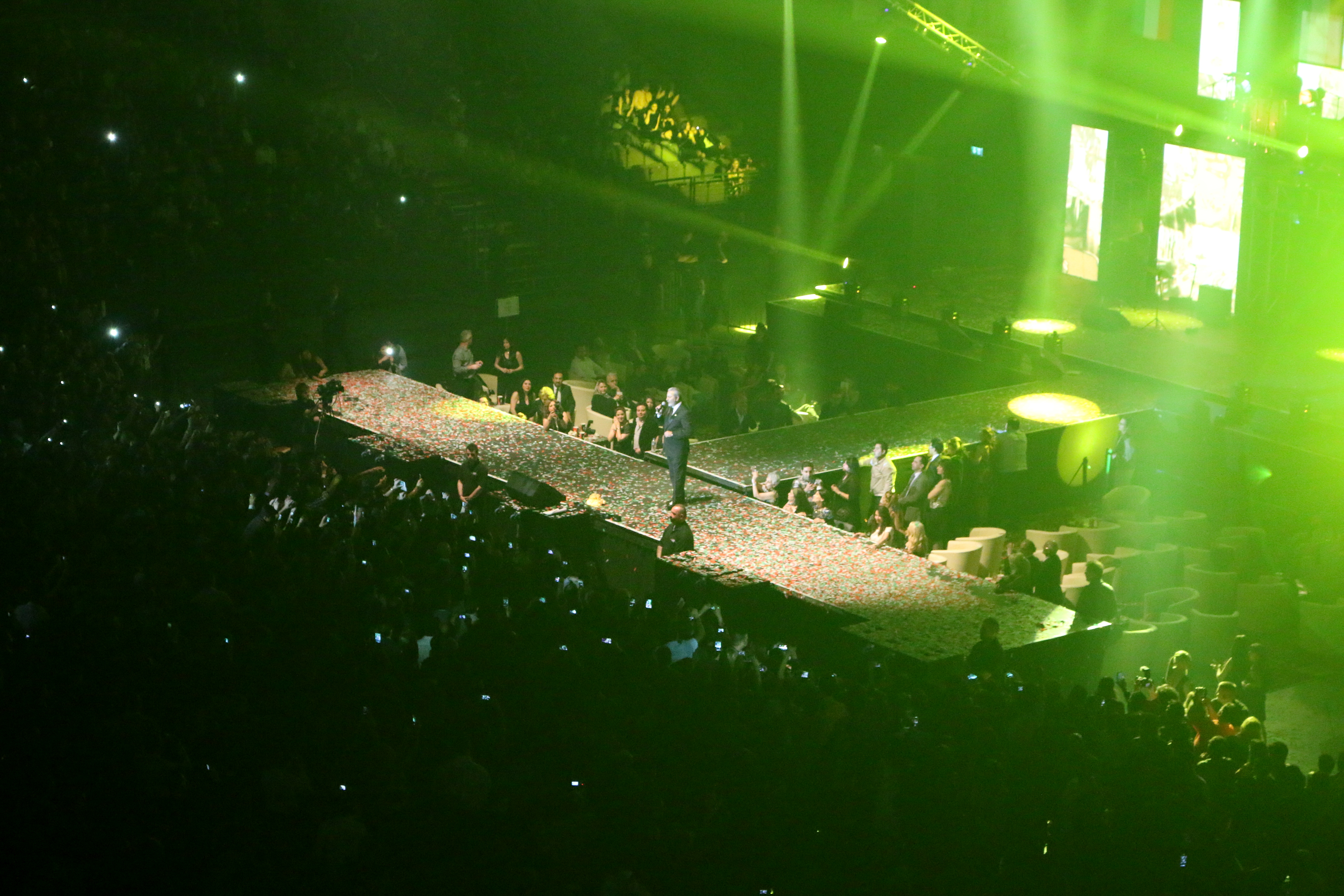
Sattar in a Persian New Year Concert, Arena Oberhausen, 2014

1. Hamsafar (1976)
2. Sedaye Baroon (1978)
3. Iran Iran (1980)
4. Shenasnameh (1982)
5. Eyde Shoma Mobarak (with Mahasti & Naser Cheshmazar) (1982)
6. Raaze Del (with Hayedeh) (1983)
7. Shazdeh Khanoom (Sattar 2)(1984)
8. Bani (1984)
9. Nargez Shiraz (with Hayedeh & Mahasti) (1984)
10. Golpari (1986)
11. Tak Khal (1987)
12. Golriz (with Susan Roshan, Mahasti, Hayedeh) (1987)
13. Parastooha (with Hayedeh & Mahasti) (1988)
14. Motreb (with Dariush & Ebi)(1988)
15. Shabe Asheghan (with Hayedeh) (1989)
16. Ghadam Ranjeh (1990)
17. Gole Pooneh (1990)
18. Ziafat (Sattar & Mahasti & Faramarz Asef) (1991)
19. Sekkeh Tala (Sattar & Shohreh & Shahram Solati) (1993)
20. Ziyarat (with Ebi & Shohreh) (1993)
21. Armaghan (with Delaram) (1994)
22. Haghighat (with Mahasti) (1995)
23. Fasle Panjom (1995)
24. Man o Ghoroob o Jaddeh: Hekayat 3 (1996)
25. Raghib (1993)
26. Haghighat (with Mahasti) (1995)
27. Nemizaram Beri (Sattar & Shohreh & Shahram Solati) (1996)
28. Bi Eshgh Hargez (1996)
29. Ashk (1997)
30. Do Parandeh (1998)
31. Shame Akhar (1998)
32. Deltangi (1998)
33. Koocheh (1998)
34. Masti (1999)
35. Gole Gandom (with Mahasti) (2000)
36. Gelayeh (2001)
37. Bazm Avaye Deldadegan (2002)
38. Setareh Bazi (2002)
39. Golhaye Ghorbat 5 (with Golpa) (2003)
40. Golbanoo (2006)
41. Friends (Sattar & Morteza & Saeid Mohammadi & Shila) (2008)
42. 40 Years of Memories (2013)
43. Bazm Shabe Chele (2020)

== See also ==
- Iraj Janatie Ataie
- Leila Kasra
- Shahyar Ghanbari
