= Siavash Ghomayshi =

Iranian singer-songwriter and musician (born 1945)

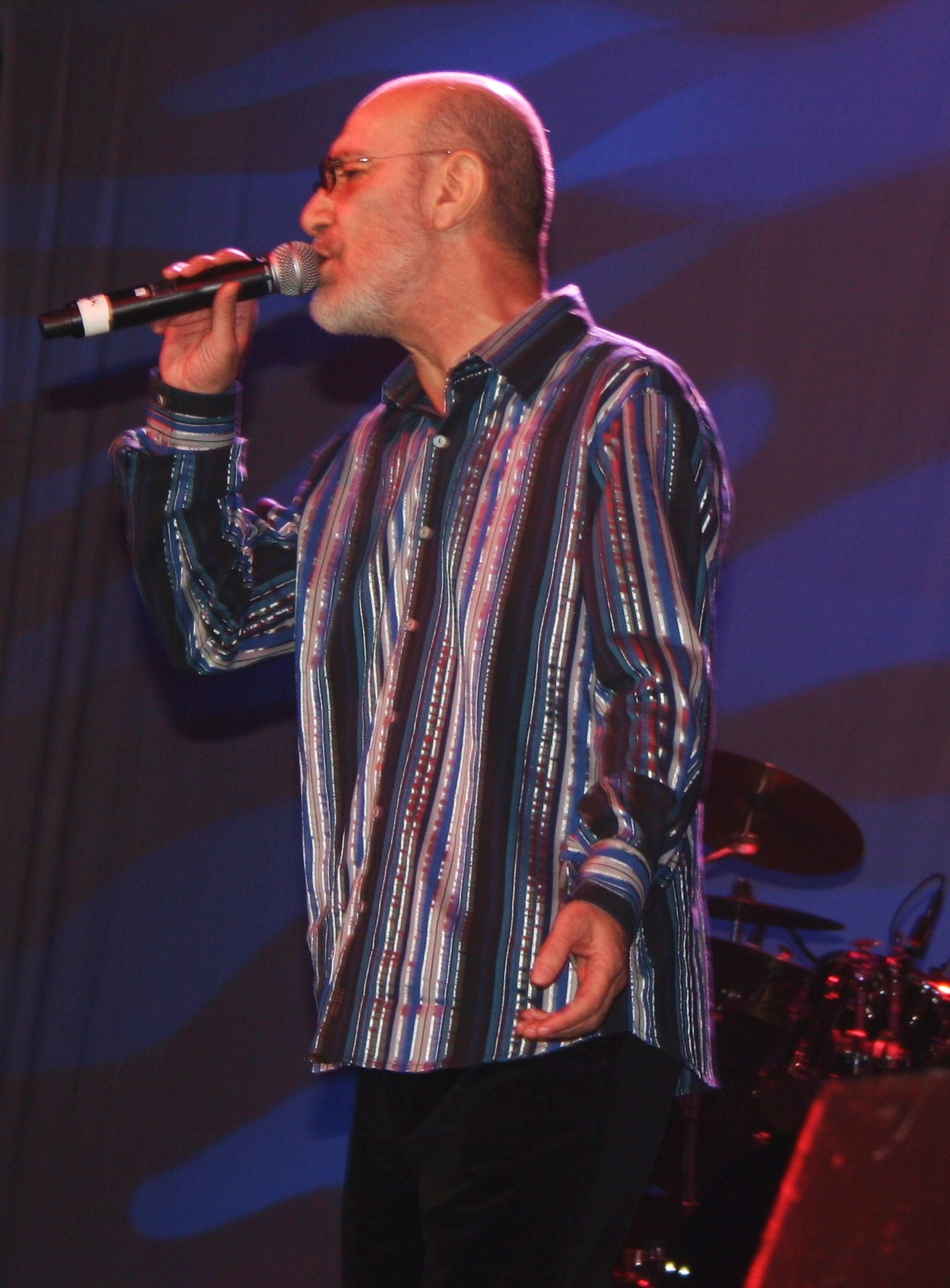
- Ghomayshi in 2009

Background information
- Born: 11 June 1945 (age 81); Ahvaz, Iran
- Genres: Pop rock, blues rock, folk rock, rock and roll, trance, reggae
- Occupations: Musician, singer-songwriter, composer
- Instruments: Vocals, piano, guitar, keyboard
- Years active: 1958–present
- Labels: Taraneh Records; Caltex Records; Avang Music
- Website: siavashghomayshi.org

Siavash Ghomayshi (Persian: سیاوش قمیشی; born 11 June 1945, Ahvaz) is an Iranian musician, singer and songwriter. Siavash studied music in London where he got his master's degree. He left Iran in 1978 and now lives in Los Angeles. Over the past four decades, he composed songs for artists like Ebi, Moein, Googoosh, Aref, Mansour, Leila Forouhar, Shohreh Solati and others.

== Biography ==
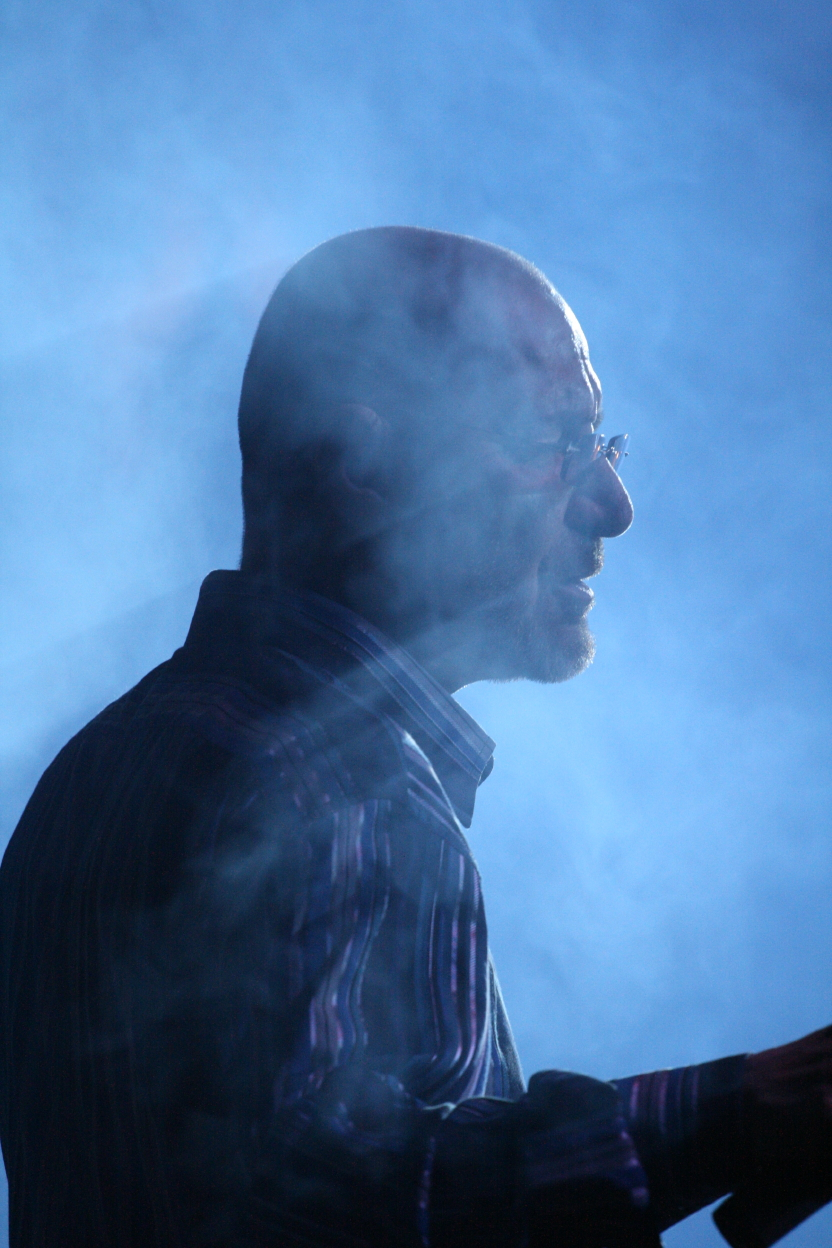
Ghomayshi during his concert in Kuala Lumpur (2009)

Siavash Ghomayshi was born in Ahvaz, Iran on 11 June 1945. He started his career as a composer when he was just 12. Siavash holds a master's degree in classical jazz from Royal Society of Arts in London, England, where he majored in pop music. He worked with some popular bands in England such as the Avengers and the Insects as lead guitarist and lead singer. When he returned to Iran at the age of 25, he started his career mainly as a composer. Ghomayshi has created numerous melodies and lyrics for famous Persian artists. Ghomayshi wrote his first song, called Ghayeghran (Boatman) for Zia when he was only 13 old years. Although initially considered a composer, in the latter years he released his first single Farangis, and has since continued his work as a singer, composer, arranger, and lyricist. He lived in Iran until the age of 33, then decided to leave the country once again to pursue his career in the United States.

In recent years Siavash Ghomayshi has explored electronic music as well such experimentation has introduced new elements into his music and the whole Iranian pop music. He is known as the father of trance music in Iran. Among the 18 albums Ghomayshi has recorded to date, Ragbaar, Roozhaye Bi Khatereh (Days with No Memories), Bi Sarzamin-tar az Baad (More Homeless Than The Wind), Taak (The Vine), and last but certainly not the least Yadegari (Memento) (2011) have been among his most successful. Because of the popularity of Siavash's voice among young generation, in recent years many singers have followed his style.

Although his albums may be considered largely non-political, he expresses a longing for his home country. Ghomayshi has also had significant involvement in albums released by various musical compatriots, The Story of Yours, The Story of Mine, Setarehaye Sorbi (1995) and Shab-e Niloufari (2003), which attracted a lot of attention with great reviews. His music can be considered as Persian-language pop/rock, in contrast to the vocal stylings most often associated with adult contemporary singers.

In 2011 in an interview with teamghomayshi.com he stated that Yadegari (Memento) (2011) would most probably be his last album, However, till present day, his last album is Sargozasht (2017) that contains 9 songs; but to let his fans enjoy his music and his unique style, he will be releasing singles.

== Discography ==
=== Albums ===
- Farangis (1973)
- Hekayat (Anecdote) (1992)
- Khabe Baroon (Dreaming of the Rain) (1993)
- Taak (Vine) (1993)
- Ghesseye Golo Tagarg (The Story of the Flower and the Hailstone) (1994)
- Shahre Khorshid (City of the Sun) (1995) (Instrumental)
- Havaye Khooneh (Nostalgic) (1996)
- Ghesseye Amir (Amir's Story) (1996)
- Ghabe Shishei (Glass Frame) (1998)
- Shokoufehaye Kaviri (Blossoms of the Desert) (2000)
- Hadeseh (The Incident) (2001)
- Neghab (Mask) (2002)
- Bi Sarzamin Tar Az Baad (Landless Like The Wind) (2003)
- Roozhaye Bi Khatereh (Days with No Memories) (2005)
- Ghoroub Ta Tolou (Sunset to Sunrise) (2006) (Remix)
- Ragbaar (Rain Shower) (2008)
- Yadegari (Souvenir) (2011)
- Sarghozasht (History) (2017)

=== Singles ===
- Rafigh Single (Buddy) (2009)
- Baazi Single (The Game) (2011)
- Tekrar Single (Repeat) (2012)
- Parvaz Single (Flight) (2012)
- Parandeh Single Ft. Moein (Bird) (2013)
- Navazesh Single (Caress) (2013)
- Tardid Single (Doubt) (2014)
- Ayandeh Single (Future) (2014)
- Mohabat Single (Kindness) (2014)
- Tehran Single (Tehran City) (2014)
- Pooch Single (Null) (2015)
- Goli Jan Single (Dear Goli) (2015)
- Hasrat Single (Envy) (2015)
- Masir Single (Path) (2015)
- Khastegia Single (Tiredness) (2016)
- Javooneh Single (Sapling) (2016)
- Ahvaz Single (Ahvaz City) (2017)
- 40 Saal Single Ft.Googoosh (40 Years) (2018)
- Ashegh Single (Lover) (2019)
- Bebakhsh Single (Forgive) (2019)
- Sarnevesht 2 Single (Fate) (2020)
- Gozasht Single (Passed) (2021)
- Marham Single (2021)
- Safar Single (Journey) (2022)
- Khazoon Single (Autumn) (2022)
- Barax Single (Contrariwise) (2022)
- Mojeze Single (The Miracle) (2022)
- Deltang Single (2023)
- Miri Single (2023)
- Taghdim Single (2024)
- Sarab Single (2024)
- Tavahom Single (2024)
- Parvaneh Single (2025)
- Ghasedak Single (2025)
- Elahi Single (2025)
