= Shahyar Ghanbari =

Shahyar Ghanbari شهیار قنبری
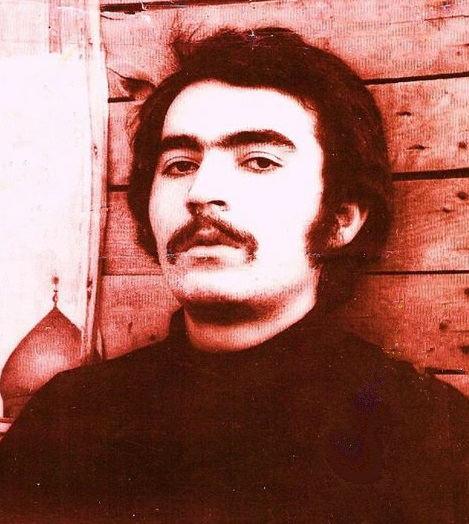

Background information
- Born: July 28, 1950 (age 76)
- Origin: Tehran, Iran
- Genres: Persian pop music
- Occupations: Poet, Lyricist
- Years active: 1968–present
- Website: ShahyarGhanbari.Com

Shahyar Ghanbari, also spelled incorrectly as Shahryar Ghanbari (born 28 July 1950 in Tehran; Persian: شهیار قنبری) is an Iranian poet, writer, lyricist, songwriter, and singer of Persian pop music. He is also a film director and radio-TV producer .

Shahyar is the son of Hamid Ghanbari, an Iranian actor, dubber, and singer. He writes and sings in Persian, English and French. His songs typically feature love, solitude, and nostalgia. He currently lives in the United States.

== Studio albums ==
- IF (1981)
- The Earthless Tree (1991)
- Forbidden (1992)
- Travelog (1994)
- Nakedness (1998)
- Forbidden Plus (1999)
- I Love You’s (2001)
- Rewind Me in Paris (2003)
- Reborn (2010)نو نفس
- Les Coeurages (2011)
- The Milky Voice(La Voix Lacté) (2016)غزلصدا
- Cine Mot /کلمه سینما (2021
- The Sea in me/2024) صدای دریا در من

== Filmography ==
- Iran - sous le voile des apparences (2003), Composer
- Sham-e akhar: The Last Supper (1976), Director and Writer
- Khane-kharab (1975), Actor
- Khodahafez Rafigh (1971), Songwriter
- Subah-O-Shaam (1971), Songwriter for Persian version

== Books ==
- The Sea In Me (1995)
- Derakhte Bi Zamin (1991) / The Earth-less TREE
- Goftan baraye ZIBA shodan / Dire pour devenir plus beau
- Shahyar's LEONARD
- Benevis, Saat e paknevis / MASTERING TIME

== See also ==
- Ardalan Sarfaraz
