= List of Iranian musicians =

This is a list of Iranian (Persian) musicians and musical groups.

== Classical ==
=== Persian classical/traditional ===
| Name | Birth year | Death year |
|---|---|---|
| Mirza Abdollah | 1843 | 1918 |
| Nematollah Aghasi | 1939 | 2005 |
| Salar Aghili | 1977 | living |
| Azam Ali | 1970 | living |
| Hossein Alizadeh | 1951 | living |
| Davood Azad | 1963 | living |
| Pejman Azarmina | 1973 | living |
| Iraj Bastami | 1977 | 2003 |
| Gholam-Hossein Banan | 1908 | 1986 |
| Hossein Behroozinia | 1962 | living |
| Sima Bina | 1945 | living |
| Mehdi Bozorgmehr | | |
| Delkash | 1925 | 2004 |
| Reza Ghassemi | 1949 | living |
| Akbar Golpayegani | 1934 | 2023 |
| Mohammad Mehdi Goorangi | | |
| Shusha Guppy | | |
| Alireza Eftekhari | | |
| Nur Ali Elahi | | |
| Hayedeh | 1942 | 1990 |
| Parvaz Homay | | |
| Sa'id Hormozi | | |
| Mirza Hossein-Qoli | 1853 | 1916 |
| Fariborz Lachini | | |
| Kayhan Kalhor | | |
| Hossein Khajeh Amiri (Iraj) | 1940 | |
| Ruhollah Khaleghi | 1906 | 1965 |
| Darvish Khan | 1872 | 1926 |
| Mohammad Reza Lotfi | 1947 | 2014 |
| Javad Maroofi | | |
| Marzieh | 1924 | 2010 |
| Mina | 1700s | 1800s |
| Mina Oftadeh (Iranian Santur Player) | | |
| Moein | 1952 | |
| Rokneddin Mokhtari | | |
| Moshtari Khanum | c. 1786 | c. 1883 |
| Mohammad Motamedi | | |
| Hamid Motebassem | | |
| Shahram Nazeri | | |
| Hamid Reza Noorbakhsh | | |
| Hossein Omoumi | | |
| Parisa | | |
| Faramarz Payvar | | |
| Iraj Rahmanpour | | |
| Mehdi Rajabian | | |
| Afsaneh Rasaei | | |
| Anoushiravan Rohani | | |
| Reza Rohani | | |
| Ezzat Rouhbakhsh | 1908 | 1989 |
| Abolhasan Saba | | |
| Bardia Sadrenoori | | |
| Dariush Safvat | | |
| Shahin Shahbazi | | |
| Abdolvahab Shahidi | 1922 | 2021 |
| Jalil Shahnaz | | |
| Ali-Akbar Shahnazi | | |
| Homayoun Shajarian | | |
| Mohammad-Reza Shajarian | 1940 | 2020 |
| Farhang Sharif | | |
| Haj Ghorban Soleimani | | |
| Ali Tajvidi | 1919 | 2006 |
| Dariush Talai | | |
| Hossein Tehrani | | |
| Ali Zand Vakili | | |
| Alinaghi Vaziri | | |
| Qamar ol-Molouk Vaziri | | |
| Mortezâ Varzi | | |
| Parviz Yahaghi | 1935 | 2007 |
| Amir Abbas Zare | | |
| Hasan Zirak | | |
| Zohreh | 1700s | 1800s |
| Jalal Zolfonun | | |
| Mahmoud Zolfonun | | |
| Zyriab | | |

== Pop ==
=== Singers ===
- Afshin
- Afshin Moghaddam
- Ali Abdolmaleki
- Ali Lohrasbi
- Ali Pahlavan
- Alireza Assar
- Alireza Talischi
- Andy
- Arash
- Aref
- Babak Jahanbakhsh
- Benyamin Bahadori
- Bijan Mortazavi
- Dariush
- Ebi (Ebrahim Hamedi)
- Ehsan Khajeh Amiri
- Elaheh
- Faramarz Asef
- Faramarz Aslani
- Farhad
- Farman Fathalian
- Farzad Farzin
- Farzane Zamen
- Fereydoon Forooghi
- Fereydoun Farrokhzad
- Googoosh (Faegheh Atashin)
- Habib
- Hassan Shamaizadeh
- Hayedeh
- Homeyra
- Hooshmand Aghili
- Javad Yasari
- Kouros Shahmiri
- Kian Pourtorab
- Laleh
- Leila Forouhar
- Mahasti
- Mahvash
- Majid Akhshabi
- Majid Razavi
- Mansour
- Marjan
- Martik
- Maziar
- Mehdi Yarrahi
- Mehrnoosh
- Mehrdad Asemani
- Moein
- Mohammad Esfahani
- Mohsen Chavoshi
- Mohsen Ebrahimzadeh
- Mohsen Yeganeh
- Morteza
- Morteza Pashaei
- Nematollah Aghasi
- Omid Hajili
- Pooran
- Pouya Kolahi
- Pouya Pourjalil
- Pyruz
- Roozbeh Azar
- Rana Mansour
- Reza Sadeghi
- Roya Arab
- Sahar
- Sami Beigi
- Sami Yusuf
- Sasy
- Sattar
- Sepideh
- Shab (singer)
- Shahkar Bineshpajooh
- Shahram Shabpareh
- Shahrum Kashani
- Shakila
- Shohreh Solati
- Siavash Ghomayshi
- Siavash Shams
- Sirvan Khosravi
- Susan
- Susan Roshan
- Toofan
- Viguen
- Xaniar Khosravi

=== Bands ===
- 25band
- Abjeez
- Arian
- Barobax
- Kako Band

=== Songwriters ===
- Ilya
- Hangi Tavakoli
- Roya Arab
- Mina Assadi
- Laleh

=== Lyricists ===
- Amir Tataloo
- Molana
- Shahyar Ghanbari
- Maryam Heydarzadeh
- Leila Kasra
- Hangi Tavakoli
- Sahar Ajdamsani
- Rahim Moeini Kermanshahi

== Rock/Metal ==
=== Singers ===
- Afshin Moghadam
- Ali Azimi
- Azita Youssefi
- Kamil Yaghmaei
- Kavus Torabi
- Kourosh Yaghmaei
- Kaveh Afagh
- Kian Pourtorab
- Habib
- Martik Kanian
- Maryama
- Mohsen Chavoshi
- Morteza Pashaei
- Pouya Kolahi
- Reza Yazdani
- Salim Ghazi Saeedi
- Shahin Najafi
- Mohsen Namjoo

=== Bands ===
- 127
- Angband
- Antikarisma
- Arashk
- Arsames
- Barad
- Hypernova
- Kiosk
- Take It Easy Hospital
- The Yellow Dogs Band

== Electronic ==
- Ashkan Kooshanejad
- Leila Arab
- Deep Dish
- DJ Aligator
- Masoud
- Steve Naghavi
- Nami
- Ali "Dubfire" Shirazinia
- Sharam Tayebi
- Patrick Alavi
- Kian Pourtorab

== Rap/Hip Hop ==
- Hichkas
- Erfan
- Zedbazi
- Bahram
- Shahin Najafi
- Amir Tataloo
- Yas

== Jazz ==
- Viguen
- Ardeshir Farah
- Rana Farhan
- Cymin Samawatie (German of Iranian background)
- Shahin and Sepehr
- Ziba Shirazi
- Golnar Shahyar

== Blues ==
- Kourosh Yaghmaei
- Martik Qarah Khanian

== Film composers ==
- Saeed Shahram
- Fariborz Lachini

== See also ==
- List of Iranian musical groups
- Music of Iran
- Shiraz Arts Festival
- Iranian rock
- Iranian pop music
- Iranian hip hop
