= List of Iranian singers =

This is a list of notable Iranian singers that have entered the industry, currently working or have left the industry.

== A ==
- Ali Abdolmaleki (1984–)
- Kaveh Afagh (1983–)
- Afat (1934–2007)
- Afshin (1955–)
- Nazanin Afshin-Jam (1979–)
- Morteza Ahmadi (1924–2014)
- Nematollah Aghasi (1939–2005)
- Sahar Ajdamsani (1996–)
- Majid Akhshabi (1973–)
- Azam Ali (1979–)
- DJ Aligator (1975–)
- Ehsan Khajeh Amiri (1984–)
- Andy (1958–)
- Arash (1977–)
- Amir Hossein Arman (1982–)
- Faramarz Aslani (1954–2024)
- Faramarz Assef (1950–)
- Azad (1973–)
- Davood Azad (1963–)
- Azar Azima (1927–2026)

== B ==
- Benyamin Bahadori (1982–)
- Bahram (1988–)
- Gholam Hossein Banan (1911–1986)
- Barbad
- Abdi Behravanfar (1975–)
- Sami Beigi (1982–)
- Sima Bina (1945–)
- Shahkar Bineshpajooh (1972–)

== C ==
- Cameron Cartio (1978-)
- Mohsen Chavoshi (1979–)

== D ==
- Dariush (1951–)
- Donya Dadrasan (1998–)

== E ==
- Ebi (1949–)
- Mohsen Ebrahimzadeh (1987–)
- Ali Reza Eftekhari (1958–)
- Elaheh (1934–2007)
- Erfan (1983–)
- Mohammad Esfahani (1966–)

== F ==
- Fereydoun Farrokhzad (1938-1992)
- Farzad Farzin (1981–)
- Leila Forouhar (1959–)

== G ==
- Siavash Ghomayshi (1945–)
- Alireza Ghorbani (1973–)
- Googoosh (1950–)
- Shusha Guppy (1935–2008)

== H ==
- Habib (1947–2016)
- Hayedeh (1942–1990)
- Hassan Zirak (1921–1972)
- Shervin Hajipour (1997–)

== I ==
- Iraj (1933–)
- Iraj Rahmanpour (1957–)

== J ==
- Babak Jahanbakhsh (1983–)
- Mozhdah Jamalzadah (1982–)

== K ==
- Bijan Kamkar (1965–)
- Adib Khansari (1921–1982)
- Sirvan Khosravi (1982–)
- Xaniar Khosravi (1985–)
- Shahrum Kashani (1974–2021)

== L ==
- Laleh (1982–)
- Soroush Lashkary (1985–)
- Ali Lohrasbi (1976–)

== M ==
- Mahsa Vahdat (1973–)
- Mansour (1971–)
- Mahasti (1946–2007)
- Afsaneh Malek (1942–2026)
- Mehrdad Asemani (1967-)
- Farhad Mehrad (1944–2002)
- Moein (1952–)
- Mohammad Reza Shajarian (1940–2020)
- Morteza (1951–)
- Mohammad Motamedi (1978–)
- Bijan Mortazavi (1957–)

== N ==
- Shahin Najafi (1980–)
- Anousha Nazari (1990–)
- Nooshafarin (1957–)

== P ==
- Ali Pahlavan (1975–)
- Parisa (1950–)
- Khatereh Parvaneh (1930–2008)
- Giti Pashaei (1940–1995)
- Morteza Pashaei (1984–2014)
- Pooran (1934–1990)
- Kian Pourtorab (1986–)
- Gholamali Pouratayi (1944–2014)
- Pyruz (1962–)

== R ==
- Rashid Vatandoust (1946-)
- Behzad Ranjbaran (1955–)
- Afsaneh Rasaei (1974–)
- Reza Rooygari (1946–)
- Ezzat Rouhbakhsh (1908–1989)

== S ==
- Sattar (1949–)
- Shahram Shabpareh (1948–)
- Shakila (1962–)
- Salome MC (1985–)
- Siavash Shams (1963–)
- Sohrab Pakzad (1981-)
- Reza Sadeghi (1979–)
- Toomaj Salehi (1990–)
- Homayoun Shajarian (1975–)
- Shohreh (1964-)
- Payam Salehi (1975-)

== T ==
- Alireza Talischi (1985–)
- Amir Tataloo (1987–)
- Tara Tiba
- Toofan (1946-2012)

== V ==
- Monir Vakili (1923–1983)
- Viguen (1929–2003)

== Y ==
- Yas (1982–)
- Kourosh Yaghmaei (1946–)
- Mehdi Yarrahi (1981–)
- Reza Yazdani (1973–)
- Mohsen Yeganeh (1985–)
- Davood Younesi (1990–)

== Z ==
- Pari Zanganeh (1939–)

== See also ==
- Music of Iran
