= Omid Jalili (composer) =

Omid Jalili امید جلیلی
- Born: October 29, 1994 (age 31); Ahvaz, Iran
- Genres: Pop, R&B, dance, rock
- Occupations: singer, songwriter and composer
- Years active: 2015–present
- Label: Taraneh

Omid Jalili (Persian: امید جلیلی; born 29 October 1994) is a singer, songwriter and composer from Iran. He is also the head of the Neday Arefan music group.

== Discography ==
He started his artistic activity in 2007 and first learned the guitar from Mojtaba Aryai and in 2009 he started his professional work with Mohammad Yavari. in 2015, due to music restrictions in Iran, he immigrated to Austria.

== Political view ==
He supported the protest movement of Woman, Life, Freedom in Iran and wrote several protest songs.

== Composition ==
He has collaborated in the field of composition with Shahram Kashani, Ali Lohrasbi, Nadim, Siavash Shams in his artistic portfolio.The music of Girl with the voice of Emad is one of the most famous songs that Omid Jalili wrote and composed at the same time.

== Musical Ensemble ==
He is the leader of a mystical traditional music group called "Nedai Arefan".
