= List of Iranian musical groups =

List

This list includes notable Iranian musical groups, including bands and ensembles from various genres such as traditional, classical, folk, pop, rock, and fusion.

== List ==
Name	Year formed	Year disbanded	Place of origin	Genre / Notes
Abjeez	2005	present	Uppsala, Sweden	Pop rock / world music
Aref Ensemble	1977	present	Iran	Traditional / Persian classical music
Chaartaar	2013	present	Tehran	Electronic fusion / Persian pop
Chemirani Ensemble	1990s	present	Iran	Traditional Persian music / Percussion-focused
Dang Show	2007	present	Iran	–
Dastan Ensemble	1991	present	Iran	Persian classical music
Hamavayan Ensemble	1989	—	Tehran	Persian classical and traditional music
Lian Ensemble	1996	present	Tehran	Persian classical music / World fusion
Mastan Ensemble	2000	present	Iran	Persian classical music
Masters of Persian Music	2000	present	Tehran	Classical Persian music / supergroup
Moltafet	2002	present	Tehran	Hip hop / Persian rap
O-Hum	1998	present	Tehran	Persian rock / fusion
Shams Ensemble	1980s	present	Iran	Traditional / Sufi / Tanbour-focused
Shanbehzadeh Ensemble	1990	present	Bushehr	Folk music of southern Iran
The Kamkars	1965	present	Sanandaj	Traditional Persian & Kurdish music

== See also ==
- List of Iranian musicians
