= Afshin Moghaddam =

Iranian singer

- Born: 30 September 1945; Tehran, Imperial State of Iran
- Origin: Tehran, Iran
- Died: 23 July 1976 (aged 30) Amol, Iran
- Genres: Persian pop, pop music, rock
- Occupation: Singer
- Years active: 1966–1976
- Label: Caltex Records

Afshin Moghaddam (Persian: افشین مقدم, 30 September 1945 – 23 July 1976), born Hossein Ahanian Moghaddam, was an Iranian singer.

He was best known for his song "Zemestoun (Winter)", which came 79th in Manoto 1's "100 Greatest Iranian Songs of All-Time" chart.

Moghaddam was killed in a car accident whilst traveling to Amol, north of Iran, with three friends. All but Moghaddam survived, who later died on the way to the hospital.

== Discography ==
=== Studio albums ===
- Zemestoon: Best of Afshin (2002, Caltex Records)
