= Ziba Shirazi =

Iranian American poet, singer and songwriter

Ziba Shirazi (Persian: زیبا شیرازی) is an Iranian-American writer, poet, singer, songwriter, storyteller and ghostwriter. As a poet and music artist, she is best known for her poignant songs and storytelling through poetry. Shirazi's compositions blend flavors of Persian melodies with world music and jazz.

== Early life and education ==
Shirazi grew up in Iran, surrounded by music in a family of musicians and music lovers. She started writing poetry at 15 and dreamed of one day becoming a performer. In her teens, she became enchanted by the American musicals, My Fair Lady and Fiddler on the Roof, featured in the movie theatres in Tehran, and later on Broadway musicals continued to be a great source of inspiration.

In 1985, Shirazi left Iran for the United States, where she produced and promoted the first of seven albums, Red Apple, in 1991. This album, rejected by Iranian music producers for its unconventional lyrics and melodies, became a success soon after its launch.

== Career ==
Referred to as the 'Voice of Women' in the Iranian community, Shirazi's lyrics are colored by passionate feminist tones, love, compassion and universal human stories. "I am a shameless romantic and, shamelessly, a woman. The beauty I see is abundant, joyful, and always full of love, passion and sensuality, as they are my salvation."

Her collaboration with Chilean-American jazz pianist, Jose-Miguel Yamal, deepened the presence of jazz and Latin music in her performances. The two have performed together worldwide since 2006. Matthew Crosier from CBC Radio said, "You can expect perfect pitch voice and a top-notch band." In 2009, Shirazi created Story & Song, a lyrical storytelling performance set to live music with video projections featuring stories of Iranian immigrants and their struggles since the Islamic Revolution. This project, which was also the subject of Ziba's Master's thesis in Performance and Communication at California State University in Los Angeles, has been performed across the US and Canada.

With Kamran Afay, Ziba's thesis turned into a book, Iranian Diaspora Identities: Stories and Songs, published by Rowman and Littlefield in 2020. The book contains eighteen stories and monologues of diaspora journeys performed by Shirazi during 2009-2019 in theatres, libraries, university campuses and other venues. The stories are contextualized in two chapters that situate them in contemporary works of literature and performance on the Iranian diaspora and analyze some themes of the stories based on a model of social drama.

In 2014, Shirazi staged her first musical production, Spring Love, at the Los Angeles County Museum of Art. Spring Love celebrates the dynamic tradition of Nowruz through the story of three generations experiencing love at first sight and debuted on stage at SOKA Performing Art Center in February 2015.

== Discography ==
- Red Apple (Sibe Sorkh) (1993)
- Zananeha (1998)
- Live in Concert (1999)
- Seven Stars (2001)
- Lost Dreams (2002)
- Fresh Breeze (2005)
- My Man (2011)
- Bahar (2014)
- Love Story (2015)

== See also ==
- Music of Iran
- List of Iranian musicians
