= Mina (Iranian singer) =

19th-century female Iranian singer

- Ostad Mina
- Born: 18th century Isfahan, Zand Iran
- Died: 19th century Tehran, Qajar Iran
- Spouse: Mosfata Qoli Khan Qajar
- Persian: استاد مینا
- Dynasty: Qajar (by marriage)
- Occupation: Musician and Singer

Mina (Persian: مینا; born 18th century; died 19th century), also known as Ostad Mina (Persian: استاد مینا; lit. 'Mina, the professional' or 'Professor Mina') was a musician and singer in the royal court of Fath-Ali Shah Qajar (r. 1797–1834). She was a wife of Mosfata Qoli Khan Qajar, one of the Shah's uncles.

== Early life ==
She was born in Isfahan, Zand Iran in the 18th century.

== Music ==
Mina was a student of Sohrab Armani Esfahani, who was one the distinguished musicians of his era. She was a singer and Setar player.

== Fath-Ali Shah's court ==
Mina was a musician and singer in the court of Fath-Ali Shah Qajar (r. 1797–1834). Her voice was outstanding; and she played the Setar beautifully. Even though she was not a consort of the Shah, he brought her to his harem, paid her a salary, and provided her with all the necessary means of luxury. Mina, together with her musician colleague Zohreh, was appointed to supervise all the actors, i.e., upward of fifty ones, singers, dancers, and the players of the music instruments such as Tar, Setar, Kamancheh, Santur, and Metronome.

== Marriage ==
Mina married Mosfata Qoli Khan Qajar (b. 1755), who was one of the uncles of Fath-Ali Shah. Her husband was imprisoned by Agha Mohammad Khan Qajar (r. 1789–1797) in Tehran for a while. In 1788, Mosfata Qoli Khan was blinded by the order of Agha Mohammad Khan. However, during the reign of Fath-Ali Shah, they lived a wealthy life with dignity and respect. After a while into the reign of Fath-Ali Shah, Mosfata Qoli Khan died in Tehran.

== Children ==
Khavari, the historian contemporary to Mina, listed 12 sons and one daughter out of 24 children of Mina's husband, Mosfata Qoli Khan. However, it is not specified which ones are Mina's children, if any.
