= Majid Razavi =

Iranian singer

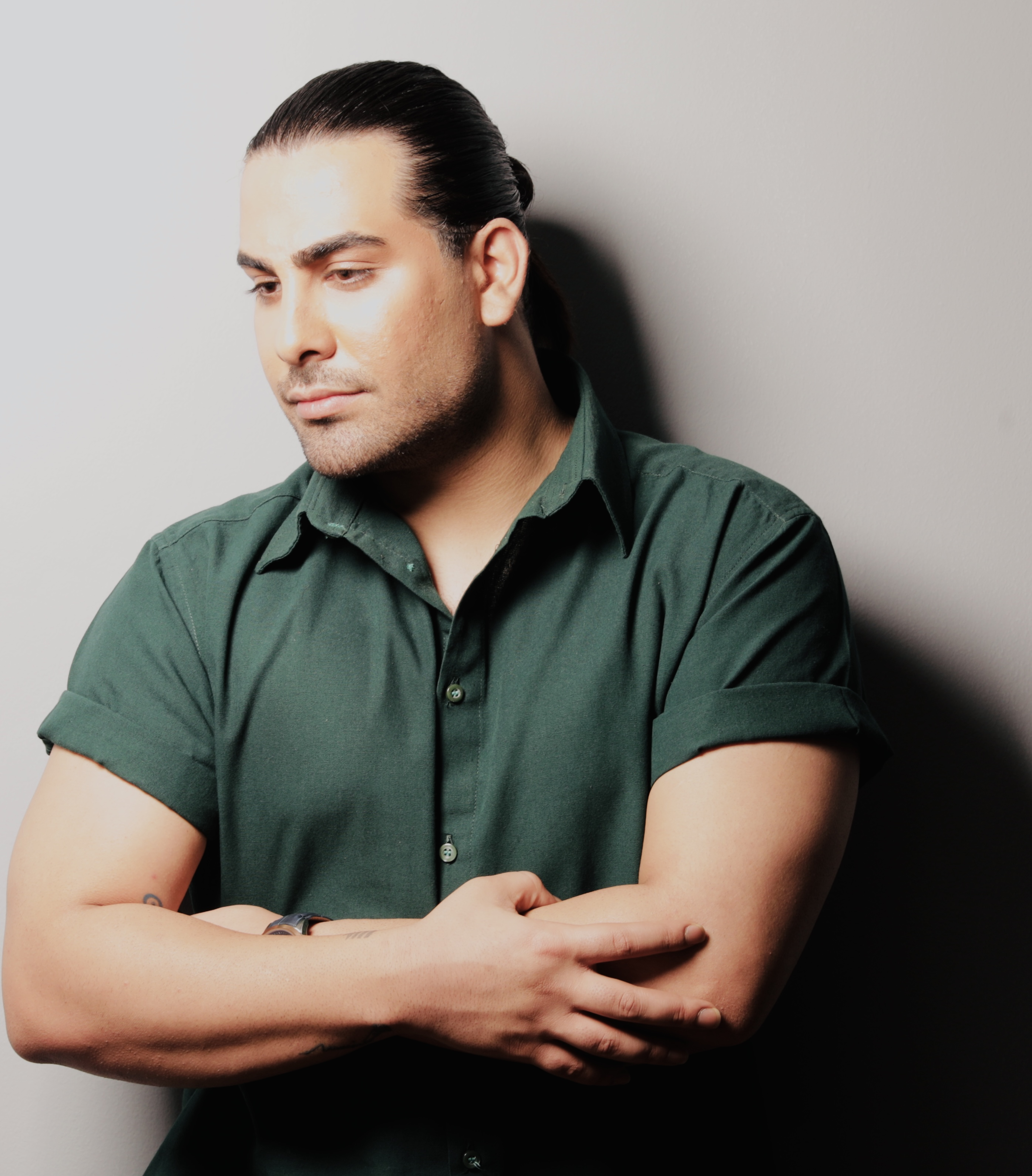

Background information
- Born: 18 May 1997 (age 29); Kermanshah, Iran
- Genres: Persian Pop
- Occupations: Singer; Songwriter; Composer
- Years active: 2018–present
- Label: Exir Novin

Majid Razavi (Persian: مجید رضوی; born 18 May 1997, in Kermanshah) is an Iranian pop music singer, songwriter and composer. He was nominated as the best pop singer in Iran in 2023 at the Hafez Awards.

== Personal life ==
Majid Razavi began his professional career in 2018 with the production of the Exir Novin Company, managed by Mohammad Reza Khanzadeh. He held his first concert on February 20, 2022 at the Royal Hall Espinas Palace Hotel and later in various cities. From the beginning of January 2023 to June 2024, he was able to top the pop singers' chart in terms of the number of concerts held, with more than 600 sessions.

The peak of his career was in 2022, when he was able to appear in prestigious and popular programs. He performed the song "Negine Ghalbami" in the New Era (TV series) special program for the New Year.

Majid Razavi holds the record for performing 17 songs in 80 minutes in his concerts, which shows that he has a good management performance and a successful concert.

Majid Razavi held his international concert tour in various European cities starting from September 10, 2024. He presented a series of concerts to audiences in various cities in Germany, the Netherlands, France, Norway, Sweden, Switzerland, Austria.

== Concert sidelines ==
On Tuesday, April 5, 2023, at one of Majid Razavi concerts in Kerman, a clash and tension arose over the hijab, which ended.

== Discography ==
=== Singles ===
| No | Name | Release date | Songwriter | Composer | Arranger |
|---|---|---|---|---|---|
| 1 | Padideh | 2018 April 26 | Majid Razavi | Majid Razavi | Amir Pedram |
| 2 | Az Khodet Begoo | 2018 September 3 | Majid Razavi | Majid Razavi | Amir Pedram |
| 3 | Asemoon | 2020 January 31 | Majid Razavi | Majid Razavi | Amir Pedram |
| 4 | Daste Gol | 2020 December 29 | Majid Razavi | Majid Razavi | Milad Torabi |
| 5 | Cheshm Zazar | 2021 Apri 1 | Majid Razavi | Majid Razavi | Masoud Jahani |
| 6 | Negine Ghalbami | 2021 December 6 | Majid Razavi | Majid Razavi | Masoud Jahani |
| 7 | Ina | 2021 December 26 | Majid Razavi | Majid Razavi | Masoud Jahani |
| 8 | Belakhare | 2022 January 23 | Majid Razavi | Majid Razavi | Masoud Jahani |
| 9 | Panje Sobh | 2022 February 8 | Majid Razavi | Majid Razavi | Milad Torabi |
| 10 | Tala | 2022 February 13 | Majid Razavi | Majid Razavi | Masoud Jahani |
| 11 | Manam | 2022 May 10 | Majid Razavi | Majid Razavi | Masoud Jahani |
| 12 | Gorgo Mish | 2022 June 26 | Majid Razavi, Arsha Radin | Majid Razavi, Arsha Radin | Masoud Jahani |
| 13 | Par Mizane | 2023 February 1 | Majid Razavi | Majid Razavi | Masoud Jahani |
| 14 | Khejalati | 2023 March 20 | Majid Razavi | Majid Razavi | Masoud Jahani |
| 15 | Ghalbami Pas | 2023 May 2 | Majid Razavi | Majid Razavi | Masoud Jahani |
| 16 | Ziba | 2023 June 12 | Majid Razavi | Majid Razavi | Masoud Jahani |
| 17 | Tang Mishe Del | 2023 October 4 | Majid Razavi | Majid Razavi | Masoud Jahani |
| 18 | Fereshte | 2023 November 1 | Majid Razavi | Majid Razavi | Masoud Jahani |
| 19 | Dooset Daram | 2024 January 5 | Majid Razavi | Majid Razavi, Arsha Radin | Ali Bayat |
| 20 | Moteasefane | 2024 February 28 | Majid Razavi, Nima Moein | Majid Razavi, Nima Moein | Ali Bayat |
| 21 | Delam Tange | 2024 May 11 | Majid Razavi, Nima Moein | Majid Razavi, Nima Moein | Ali Bayat |
| 22 | Setareh | 2024 September 4 | Majid Razavi, Nima Moein | Majid Razavi, Nima Moein | Ali Bayat |
| 23 | Mesle To | 2024 November 12 | Majid Razavi | Majid Razavi | Ali Bayat |
| 24 | Cheshme To | 2025 January 10 | Majid Razavi, Nima Moein | Majid Razavi, Nima Moein | Ali Bayat |
| 25 | Ki Midoone | 2025 April 18 | Majid Razavi, Nima Moein | Majid Razavi, Nima Moein | Ali Bayat |
| 26 | Kojaei Begoo | 2025 June 11 | Majid Razavi, Nima Moein | Majid Razavi, Nima Moein | Ali Bayat |
| 27 | Hamin Alan | 2025 September 25 | Majid Razavi, Nima Moein | Majid Razavi, Nima Moein | Ali Bayat |
