= Farman Fathalian =

Iranian rock singer (born 1970)

- Born: December 20, 1970 (age 55); Tehran, Iran
- Origin: Tehran, Iran
- Genres: fusion music
- Occupations: Singer, composer,guitarist,music teacher,head of Ilia music group
- Instruments: Guitar, tabla

Farman Fathalian (Persian: فرمان فتحعلیان, born December 20, 1970), is an Iranian composer, singer, guitarist, and music educator, widely regarded as a pioneering figure in Iran’s spiritual fusion music. Music critics in Iran recognize him as the first artist to establish a distinct and independent style within the history of Iranian spiritual–fusion music. Farman Fathalian received her first degree in art (equivalent to a Doctorate in Music) from the Iranian Ministry of Culture and Guidance in 2012.

== Musical style and history ==
Fathalian's artistic work is characterized by a unique synthesis of traditional Persian music, mystical and Sufi concepts, flamenco guitar, New Age elements, and world music influences. The thematic core of his compositions centers on spirituality, inner awareness, divine love, peace, and the relationship between humanity and the universe. Inspired by Persian mystical literature—particularly the works of poets such as Rumi and Hafez—his music creates contemplative and meditative soundscapes that have resonated with audiences both in Iran and internationally.

In 1992, Farman Fathalian became the first artist to present a flamenco guitar recital in Iran. The concert was held at the Kanoon-e Parvaresh-e Fekri Concert Hall (Iran–America Cultural Center) and was performed over three consecutive nights. He appeared on stage alongside two of his students, Shahnam Nourbakhsh and Elham Shirazi. The performances were met with an exceptional and unprecedented response from the public and the press.

Despite this success, following the concert, he was subjected to a five-year professional ban imposed by the Ministry of Culture and Islamic Guidance due to the presence of a female musician on stage. After five years of enforced inactivity, he regained official permission to resume his artistic career in 1998. In the same year, he presented another flamenco guitar recital, this time without the accompaniment of a female musician.

In recognition of his artistic achievements and contributions to Iranian music, Farman Fathalian was awarded the First-Class Artistic Degree, officially recognized as equivalent to a doctoral degree (PhD), by the Ministry of Culture and Islamic Guidance of Iran. He is also a First-Class instructor and an active member of the faculty of the Iran Music House, continuing his role in the education and development of future generations of musicians.

== Recordings ==
In 1999, he published his first official album Moghim.

He published his second album in 2001 Raahe Eshgh. The name is a Persian word, in English meaning Path of Love.

He published his third album in 2003 Mast o Kharab. Some of its lyrics were RUMi and spiritual poems.

He published another album in 2009 named Ba Mardome Biganeh.

== Discography ==
=== Studio albums ===
- Moghim, 1999
- Raahe Eshgh, 2001
- Mast O Kharab, 2003
- Ba Mardome Biganeh, 2009
- Dideye Bidar , 2016

=== Singles ===
- Aghooshe Seda , 2015
