= Kian Pourtorab =

Iranian singer, songwriter, composer & musician

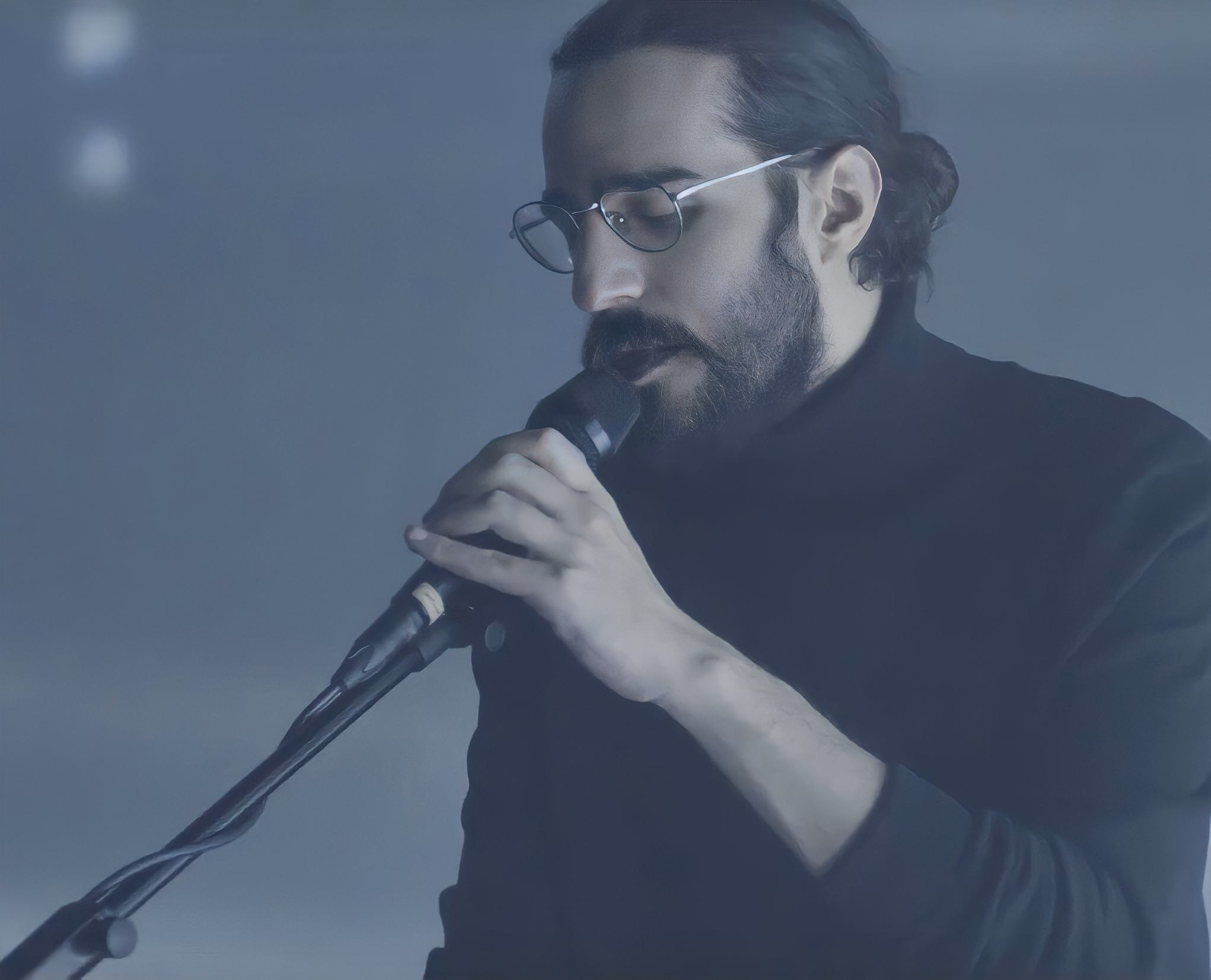

Background information
- Born: Kian Pourtorab; Tehran, Iran
- Genres: Rock; Alternative Rock; Electronic; Electropop; Ambient
- Occupations: Singer; Lyricist; Composer; Musician; Music Producer
- Instruments: Vocals; Guitar; Electric Guitar; Keyboard; Synthesizer
- Years active: 2006– present
- Website: kianpourtorab.com

Kian Pourtorab (Persian: کیان پورتراب); is a singer, songwriter, composer and musician from Iran. He is also known as the founder and lead singer of Comment Band, an alternative rock band in Iran. The band stopped activities in 2016 and Pourtorab pursued his career as a solo artist. He has since released several solo albums including “This Side (2018)”, “Q (2021)”, ”Shabgard (2022)” along with multiple solo singles such as “Delsard”, “Ye Khabeh, Na Bishtar”, and “Bord o Bakht”.

== Early life and history ==
Kian Pourtorab was born and raised in Tehran, Iran. When he was 16, his cousin left a guitar at his place and did not return for a while. Pourtorab started experimenting with different notes and the feedback that he received from family and friends made him pursue the music more seriously.

Eventually he began composing his own songs, adding lyrics to the songs and recording them at a studio. In 2006, he founded his own rock band called the Comment Band and started performing with its other members including Nima Ramezan (guitar), Bardia Amiri (drums), Ashkan Abron (keyboard) and Arin Keshishi (bass guitar). The band's first album “Miram Balatar (Going Higher)” was released in 2008. They released two more albums titled “Dayereha (Circles)” and “Rafte Az Dast (Slipped Away/Lost)” which were followed by series of concerts over the years. The band continued to rehearse and perform until mid 2016 when suddenly stopped all activities.

== Career ==
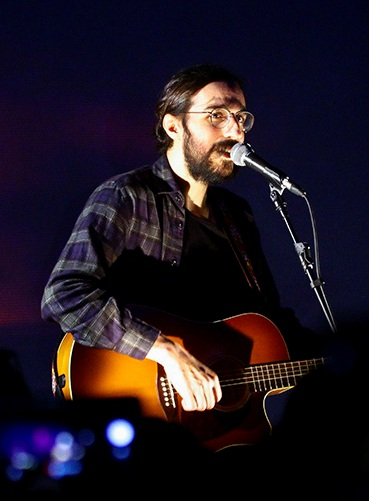
Kian Pourtorab at album release party in Tehran

In 2016, Kian Pourtorab announced that he had been working on an individual project for a year and his debut solo single “Pieces” would be released soon. Subsequently, his debut solo album “This Side” was released in 2018 and climbed to the top of the best-selling albums chart in its first week. The album tracks were minimal and in ambient and electronic genres. All work on this album such as composing, writing lyrics, playing instruments, and making arrangements was performed by himself. When asked about the similarity between this album and Comment Band's albums, Pourtorab said “the atmosphere of this album doesn't resemble my style in Comment Band. In this album, I have tried to distance myself from my old version, which was quite challenging, because I had to discover new dimensions of myself and invent a new me in music. On the other hand, it was really amazing, as I was completely myself, and every good or bad outcomes were just mine".

Pourtorab's second solo album “Q”, was released in 2021. “Q” stands for quarantine, and the album was inspired and written by him during the lock down. This album has 6 tracks and is close to Lo-fi style and ambient genres. Each track of this album reflects a different phase of the pandemic outbreak.

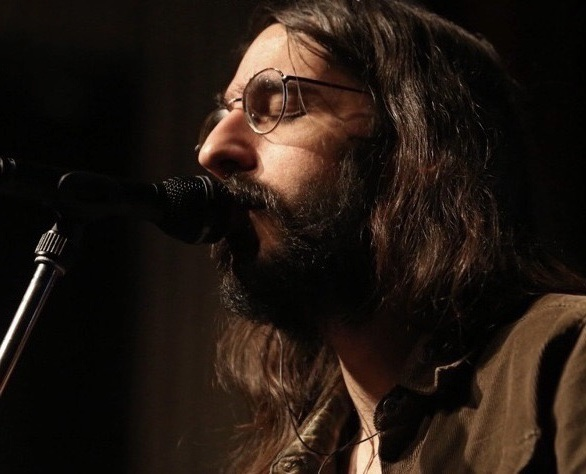
Kian Pourtorab live at concert

In 2022, Pourtorab released his third solo album, “Shabgard” which falls into the genre of electropop music. The word “Shabgard” is an adjective meaning the one who explores at nights, and the album's theme revolves around those who enjoy night life. Just like the previous albums, Pourtorab worked on this album by himself, with a small team assisting in certain aspects of production such as arrangement, mixing, and mastering.

Pourtorab has also had numerous collaborations with other musicians such as Arman Garshasbi, Milad Derakhshani, King Raam as a featured artist on their songs, and has composed, written lyrics, played instruments, and arranged music for them. During past years, he has made several concert appearances throughout Iran, performing with his band and then as a solo artist.

== Achievements ==
Pourtorab has achieved various recognition and awards. The album "Slipped Away (Lost)" by his band, Comment Band, won the award for the Best Pop-Rock Album at the Musicema Awards In 2015. In a 2019 article, Pourtorab and his band were recognized among the few musicians in Iran who play rock music and contribute to shaping the rock genre in the country. According to a poll conducted by Rokna News Agency in 2018, Pourtorab was voted the most popular rock singer in Iran. His compositions written for Comment Band were honored in the Best Fusion Composer category at the 31st Fajr International Music Festival. In 2019, he was nominated for the Best Songwriter of the Year at the Musicema Awards. The album "Rafteh Az Dast (Lost)" has been listed among the top 21 albums of the year in Iran in 2014. Additionally, Pourtorab's first solo album, "This Side", topped the best-selling albums chart during its first week after the initial release.

== Artistry ==
Pourtorab says that he has “always been concerned with creating; creating things that are missing in the world”. He describes that “he does not limit himself to any particular music genre, and he considers the genres to be the least important part of music"; in his words "genres are just layouts to express the ideas that an artist has in mind”. He states that “anything irregular can be art too”.

== Discography ==
=== Studio albums ===
- Miram Balater; Going Higher (Comment Band 2008)
- Dayereha; Circles (Comment Band 2012)
- Rafte Az Dast; Slipped Away/Lost (Comment Band 2014)
- In Samt; This Side (2018)
- Shabgard (2022)

=== EPs ===
- Q (2021)
- Gozar (2023)

=== Instrumental ===
- Maranjab (2023)

=== Singles ===
- Pieces (2016)
- Delsard (2017)
- Bargard; Come Back (2018)
- Ye Khabeh, Na Bishtar (2019)
- Bord o Bakht (2019)
- Shayad Sabz; Maybe Green (2019)
- Promise (2020)
- Emshab; Tonight (2020)
- Shahre Khamoosh (2021)
- Nemitabi (2022)

=== Collaborations ===
Artist Name	Album/Song Name	Collaboration	Year
Milad Derakhshani	Beshno	Duet, Lyricist	2014
Daal Group	Avazam Ra Miraghsidi	Duet	2017
King Raam	Soghout	Duet	2017
Arman Garshasbi	Shaghayegh	Arranger	2019
Amiryar	Baade To (Album)	Composer	2020
Arman Garshasbi	Shahre Khamoosh	Duet, Composer, Lyricist	2021
Arman Garshasbi	Kabus	Arranger	2022
Milad Derakhshani	Nemitabi	Duet, Composer, Lyricist, Arranger	2022

=== Compositions for own albums ===
No.	Song name	Album	Release year
1	Atraf-e Ma	Miram Balatar (Going Higher)	2008
2	Bi To	Miram Balatar (Going Higher)	2008
3	Fereshte-ye Marg	Miram Balatar (Going Higher)	2008
4	Hey To	Miram Balatar (Going Higher)	2008
5	Miram Balatar	Miram Balatar (Going Higher)	2008
6	Miresam	Miram Balatar (Going Higher)	2008
7	Mitooni	Miram Balatar (Going Higher)	2008
8	Baa Masire Baad	Dayereha (Circles)	2012
9	Daayereha	Dayereha (Circles)	2012
10	Farsang-ha	Dayereha (Circles)	2012
11	Lahzeha	Dayereha (Circles)	2012
12	Rafte Az Dast	Rafte Az Dast (Slipped Away/Lost)	2014
13	Be Fekr	Rafte Az Dast (Slipped Away/Lost)	2014
14	Setareha	Rafte Az Dast (Slipped Away/Lost)	2014
15	Negahe Man	Rafte Az Dast (Slipped Away/Lost)	2014
16	Bargasht	Rafte Az Dast (Slipped Away/Lost)	2014
17	Nemieistam	Rafte Az Dast (Slipped Away/Lost)	2014
18	Ba Masire Baad II Intro	Rafte Az Dast (Slipped Away/Lost)	2014
19	Ba Masire Baad II	Rafte Az Dast (Slipped Away/Lost)	2014
20	Az Jense Dirooz	Rafte Az Dast (Slipped Away/Lost)	2014
21	Rafte Az Dast II	Rafte Az Dast (Slipped Away/Lost)	2014
22	Derakht	Rafte Az Dast (Slipped Away/Lost)	2014
23	C	In Samt (This Side)	2018
24	Too In Khooneh	In Samt (This Side)	2018
25	Bargard	In Samt (This Side)	2018
26	Beres Be Man	In Samt (This Side)	2018
27	Napeyda	In Samt (This Side)	2018
28	Namomken	In Samt (This Side)	2018
29	In Samt	In Samt (This Side)	2018
30	Donbale Man Begard	In Samt (This Side)	2018
31	Delsard	In Samt (This Side)	2018
32	Faramooshie Mahz	In Samt (This Side)	2018
33	Nafase Akhar	In Samt (This Side)	2018
34	Vaysa	In Samt (This Side)	2018
35	Tikeha	In Samt (This Side)	2018

== See also ==
Iranian rock
