= 25band =

Iranian band

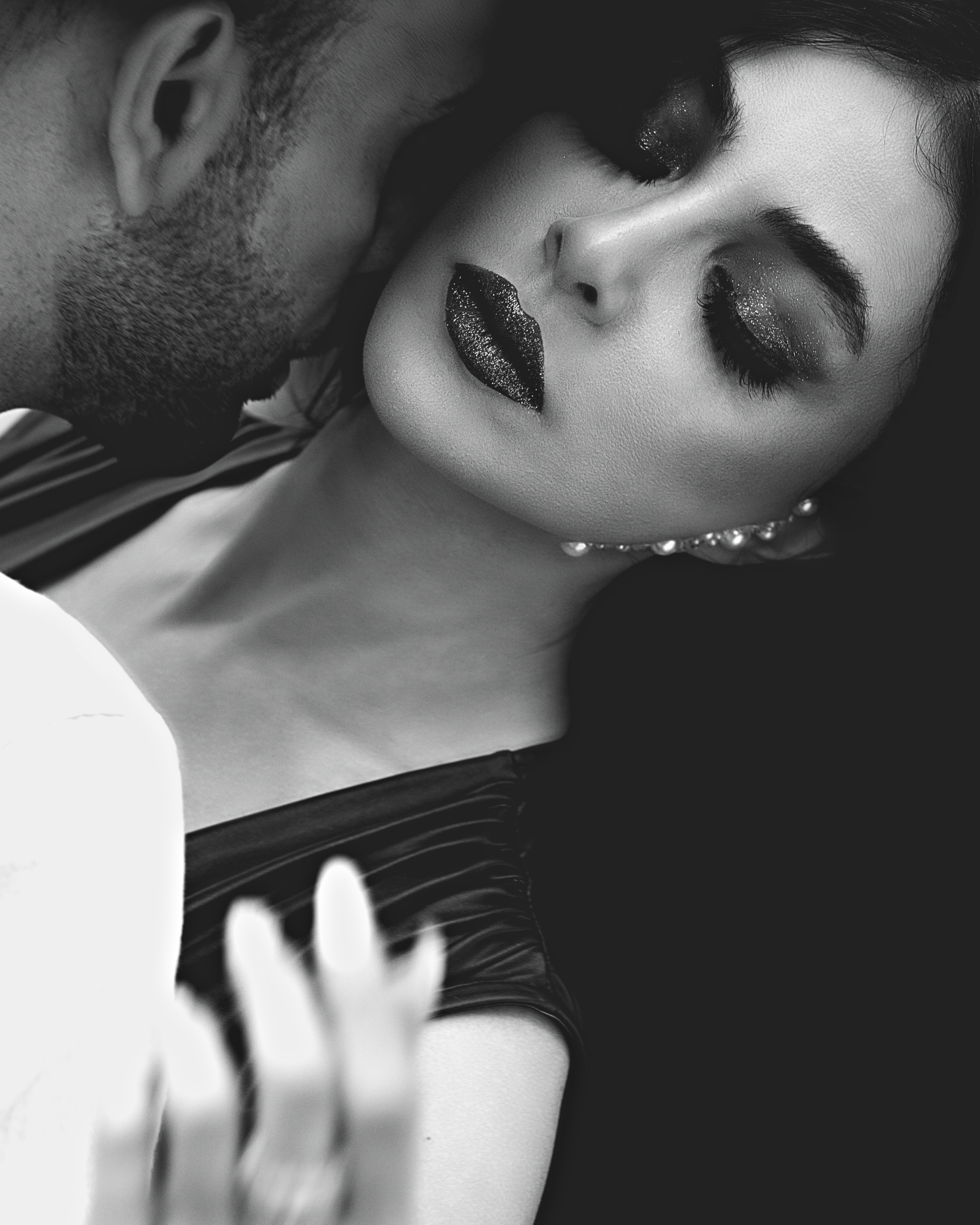

Background information
- Origin: Iran
- Genres: Persian pop, hip hop, R&B, Electronic music
- Years active: 2010-present
- Members: Tamin; A-del
- Website: 25bandmusic.com

25band (Persian: ۲۵ باند) is an Iranian music band originating from Mashhad, Iran. The band was formed in 2010 by Tamin (Tahmineh تهمینه) along with A-del (Adel عادل) as the vocalists. The name 25band means Tus, the city that the couple are from. 2 (Tu) and 5 because of its resemblance of S.

25band started in 2010 with their debut single Vaghte Parvaz (Time to Fly). Their style is a mixture of pop/electro as well as R&B, Hiphop, Jazz, Pop and Trance with Persian traditional music. They currently live in Los Angeles, California. The name 25band comes from Tus, Iran (old name of Mashhad) where both Tamin & A-del have originated from. 25band try to infuse Persian music with today's modern western style and create a unique mixture & combination.

They also had interviews with Iranian media such as BBC Persian, VOA Persian, Farsi1, Gem TV and Manoto.

== Albums ==
Puerto Rico (2011)
Track	Name	Length
1	Az Man Nagzar	3:26
2	Berese Mah	3:36
3	Bia Bia	3:01
4	Cheghadr Tanhaee Bade	3:55
5	Emshab Mikham	3:32
6	Puerto Rico	3:39
7	Vaghte Parvaz	3:02
8	Vaghte Parvaz (Remix)	5:03

Bavar (2015)
Track	Name	Lyricist
1	Man Shak Nadaram	
2	Darde Deltangi	Alirezabanparvar
3	Bavar	
4	Mosafer	
5	Dooset daram	
6	Gharantineh	
7	Tars	
8	Tariktar	

4 (2017)
Track	Name	Length
1	Male Man Shodi	
2	Fandak	
3	Baroon	
4	Ta Sobh Khoone Narim	
5	Cheghad Khoobe	
6	Enghad Bekhand	
7	Ayandeh Tarike	
8	Estakhr	

Jane Janan (2019)
Track	Name	Length
1	Khoob Kon Haalamo	3:15
2	Jane Janan	3:30
3	Doost Daram In Kaaraaro	3:07
4	Khaabe Vahshi	3:33
5	Naro	4:13
6	Divoonegi	3:45

== EPs ==
Hagh Ba Tost (2012)
Track	Name	Length
1	Hagh Ba Tost	
2	Gaahi Vaghta	
3	Ye Baade Khonak	
4	Daram Yakh Mizanam	
5	Daram Yakh Mizanam (Remix)	

== Singles ==
1. Maach (2024)
2. Delam Aab Shod (2020)
3. Jo Gandomi (2019)
4. Jane Janan (2018)
5. Divoonegi (2018)
6. Naro (2018)
7. Baroon (2017)
8. Enghad Bekhand (2016)
9. Tooye Rahe Eshghim (2015)
10. Az Pisham Miri (2014)
11. Baash Ta Bebini (2014)
12. Hamishe Ba Hamim (2013)
13. Gaahi Vaghtaa (2012)

== Concerts ==
- 25band at Casa Vertigo in Los Angeles Bavar Album Release Celebration 20 Dec 2015 United States of America
- 25band in Chicago 5 Sep 2015 United States of America
- 25band at Hard Rock Hotel in Las Vegas 25 Dec 2014 United States of America
- Persian New Year Concert at Black Magic Hall, 20 March 2012, Kuala Lumpur, Malaysia.
- 25band at KL Live, 14 September 2012, Kuala Lumpur, Malaysia.
- 25band at Chancery Pavilion Hall, 6 June 2013, Bangalore, India.
- 25band at The Forum concert hall, 16 Feb 2014, London, UK.
- 25band at Dubai World Trade Center, 30 July 2014, Dubai, UAE.
