= Mehrnoosh =

- Born: 1 November 1976 (age 49); Varamin, Iran
- Genres: Persian pop
- Occupation: Singer
- Instrument: Voice (mezzo-soprano)
- Years active: 2011–present
- Label: Avang Music

Mehrnoosh (Persian: مهرنوش; born November 1, 1976) is an Iranian Persian pop singer from Tehran. She currently lives in the state of Texas in the US after obtaining a Green Card through Diversity Visa Lottery. She is signed to the record label Avang Records, a California-based Iranian company.

She said in an interview with RadioJavan.com that most of her songs except videos, were done in Iran. She mentioned Siavash Ghomeishi, a well-known Iranian pop songwriter and singer as her favorite. Prior to her musical work, she taught mathematics at the university level in Iran. She has a master's degree in statistics.
