= Roozbeh Azar =

Iranian guitarist (born 1980)

Roozbeh Azar روزبه آذر
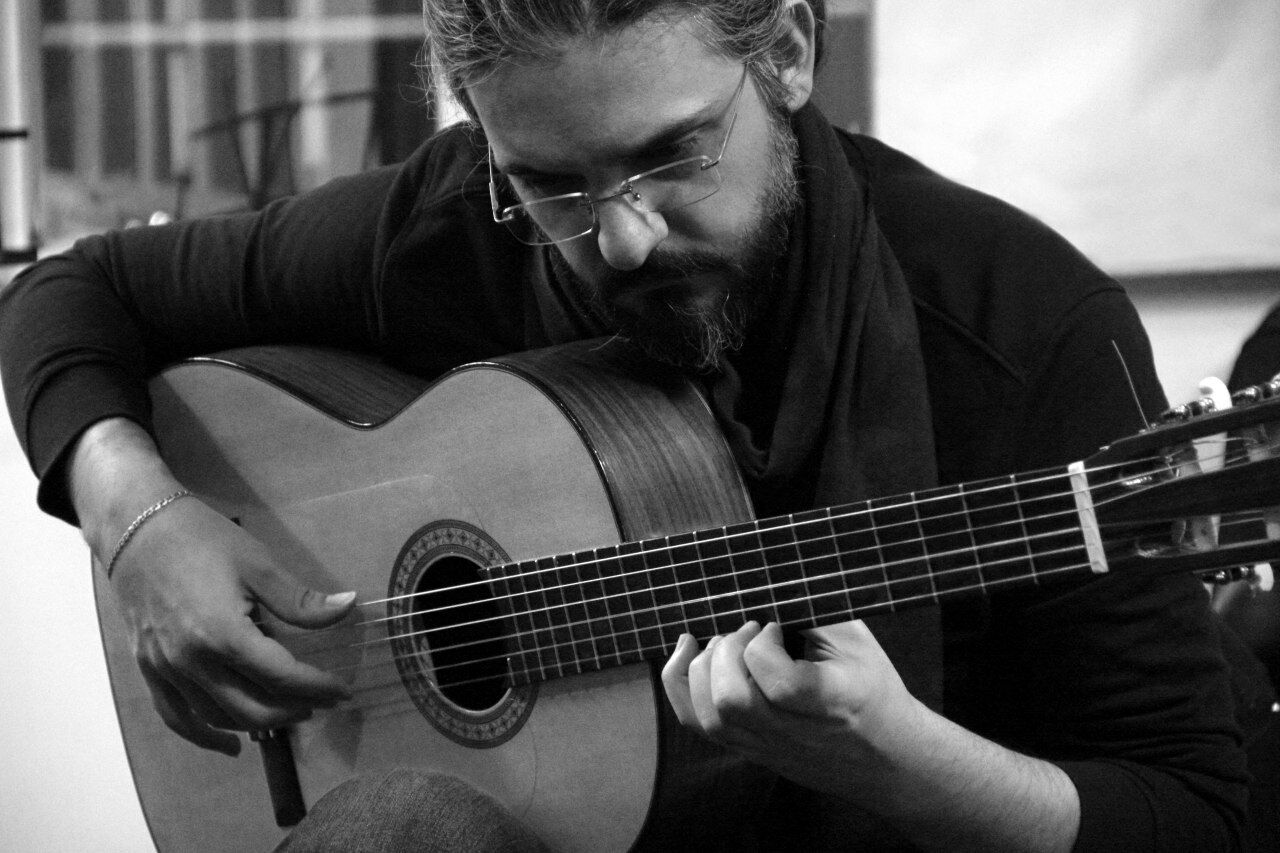

Background information
- Born: Roozbeh Azar; October 11, 1980 (age 45); Mashhad, Iran
- Origin: Mashhad, Iran
- Genres: flamenco guitar, fusion music, Persian traditional music
- Occupation: guitarist
- Years active: 1995–present

Roozbeh Azar (Persian: روزبه آذر) (born September 20, 1980, in Mashhad) is an Iranian solo guitarist in flamenco and fusion guitarist.

== Biography ==
He learned Iranian traditional music under Reza Darman, Amir Moshir Falsafi, and Faramarz Shokrkhah from 1988 to 1993. He learned flamenco guitar under supervision of Mansour Rasa in 1994 and he knew the principles of harmony and music composing under Mohammad Haghgou.

== Honors ==
- Two performances in Embassy of Spain in Tehran;
- performance in Embassy of Brazil in Tehran;
- Guitar maestro in Nima Symphonic Orchestra;
- A member of jury for a music festival in Khorasan Province in 2002;
- A member of jury in the first youth music festival in Southern Khorasan Province in 2005;
- First album selected as top 5 in "beep tunes" website in 2014;
- A member of the jury in the Institutional performances in Mashhad Province in 2016.

== Albums ==
- Alma ponte color de Naranja (Jan be Rang-e-Narenj)-Persian Fusion Music
- Her eyes of green and voice of violet
