= Shohreh =

- Gender: female

Origin
- Origin: Persian
- Meaning: famous
- Region of origin: Iran

Shohreh (Persian: شهره) is a Persian feminine given name meaning "famous".

== Notable people ==
- Shohreh Aghdashloo (born 1952), Iranian-American actress
- Shohreh Bayat (born 1987), Iranian chess referee
- Shohreh Solati (born 1957), Iranian singer
