= Hangi Tavakoli =

Music Producer

Hangi Tavakoli فرهنگ توکلی
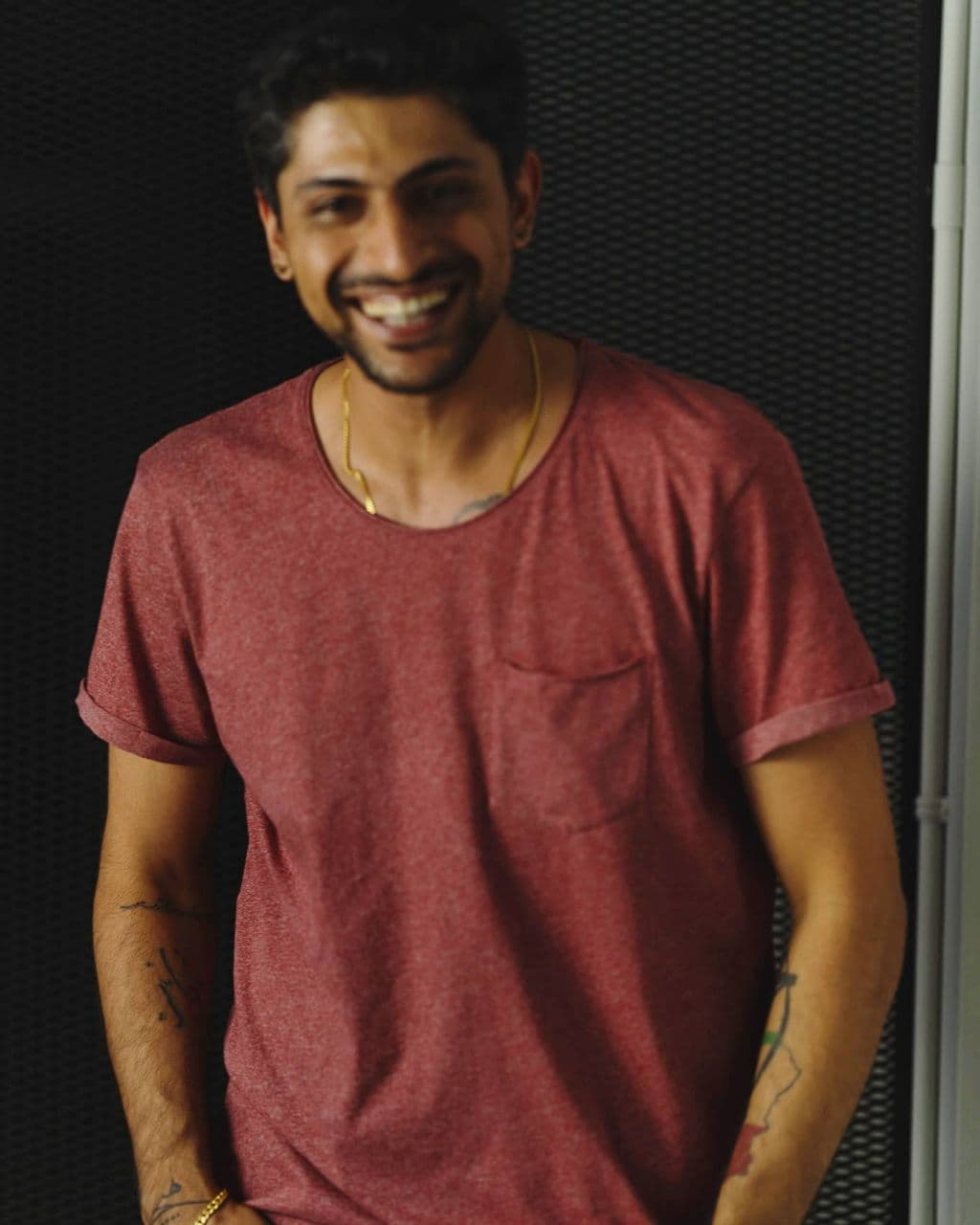

Background information
- Also known as: Hangi
- Born: Farhang Tavakoli; 7 May 1990 (age 36); Tehran, Iran
- Origin: Tehran, Iran
- Genres: Film Music, Hip hop, Pop
- Occupations: Record Producer, Composer, Music Arranger, Audio Engineer, Songwriter, Rapper, Sports manager
- Instruments: Synthesizers, Violin, Piano, Guitar, Percussion, Bass guitar, Vocal
- Years active: 2004–present
- Label: Flipside Productions
- Website: www.itshangi.com www.flipsidepm.com

Hangi Tavakoli (in Persian: فرهنگ توکلی); also known as Hangi; born as Farhang Tavakoli is an Iranian songwriter and record producer. During his active years since 2004, he had produced over 3,500 and written over 4,800 published songs for various artists including some major international hits. His productions are mainly known for his orchestral Middle-Eastern flavor. Still, he has also produced various pop and hip hop hit songs for over 150 Iranian and international artists. He is running his record label Flipside Productions as well as being an active member of Remote Control Productions.

Tavakoli's discography includes collaboration with names such as Hans Zimmer, Adele, Julia Michaels, Snoop Dogg, Ramin Djawadi, Junkie XL, Skrillex, Pitbull, Sean Paul, 2NE1, Rag 'n' Bone Man, Lukas Graham, Hozier, Shawn Mendes, Calum Scott, Imagine Dragons, Rita Ora and Sam Smith.

== Early life ==
Tavakoli has the sensory condition known as Synesthesia whereby he may "associate colors with music, or music with colors", and it allows him to visualize music.

== Immigration ==
Hangi and his musical activities were considered underground under Iranian law. Iran's government had heavy control and filtering of the music scene at the time. Currently, he is running his record label, Flipside Productions, and producing songs for local Asian artists as well as making his own music.

== Professional life ==
During his active years since 2004, he was known as one of the founders of Iranian hip-hop and has produced more than 3,500 as well as written more than 4,800 published songs and has collaborated with various international organizations such as UNESCO (music production and conducting the music band for "UNESCO PEACE ART EXHIBITION & WORKSHOP" in University Science Malaysia (USM) in 2012) and Iran's Fajr International Film Festival.

He stepped into the MMA management world in mid-2021 and started Elite Team. He represents 15+ fighters in different styles and classes of weights from Iran, Brazil, and Uzbekistan.

== Discography ==
Year	Artist	Album	Song	Role
2011	Hangi Tavakoli		Listen To Your Heart	Producer, Lyricist, Vocalist
2011	Hangi Tavakoli		Now Or Never (feat Aero & K.B)	Producer, Lyricist, Vocalist
2011	Hangi Tavakoli		Don't Get Excited	Producer, Lyricist, Vocalist
2011	Hangi Tavakoli		Why	Producer, Lyricist, Vocalist
2011	Hangi Tavakoli		Brother	Producer, Lyricist, Vocalist
2011	Hangi Tavakoli		Save Me, God	Producer, Lyricist, Vocalist
2011	Hangi Tavakoli		Memories	Producer, Lyricist, Vocalist
2011	Hangi Tavakoli		The Last Time	Producer, Lyricist, Vocalist
2011	Hangi Tavakoli		Something Special	Producer, Lyricist, Vocalist
2011	Hangi Tavakoli		I Like	Producer, Lyricist, Vocalist
2011	Hangi Tavakoli		Don't Sleep, Dad	Producer, Lyricist, Vocalist
2012	Hangi Tavakoli		Let Go (feat Mehran)	Producer, Lyricist, Vocalist
2012	Hangi Tavakoli		Stress (feat Mehran)	Producer, Lyricist, Vocalist
2012	Hangi Tavakoli		The Man (feat Mehran)	Producer, Lyricist, Vocalist
2012	Hangi Tavakoli		The 50s'	Producer, Lyricist, Vocalist
2012	Hangi Tavakoli		The Claim (feat Mehran)	Producer, Lyricist, Vocalist
2012	Hangi Tavakoli		Baldy (feat Mehran & Reihan)	Producer, Lyricist, Vocalist
2012	Hangi Tavakoli		Dear Luck (feat Mehran)	Producer, Lyricist, Vocalist
2012	Hangi Tavakoli		Open Your Eyes (feat Mehran)	Producer, Lyricist, Vocalist
2012	Hangi Tavakoli		Painkiller	Producer, Lyricist, Vocalist
2012	Hangi Tavakoli	The Documentary	Hangi's Story	Producer, Lyricist, Vocalist
2012	Hangi Tavakoli	The Documentary	I'm The Same	Producer, Lyricist, Vocalist
2012	Hangi Tavakoli	The Documentary	My Generation	Producer, Lyricist, Vocalist
2012	Hangi Tavakoli	The Documentary	Mum's Worries	Producer, Lyricist, Vocalist
2012	Hangi Tavakoli	The Documentary	My Honor (feat Mehran)	Producer, Lyricist, Vocalist
2012	Hangi Tavakoli	The Documentary	Where Are You	Producer, Lyricist, Vocalist
2012	Hangi Tavakoli	The Documentary	Get Up	Producer, Lyricist, Vocalist
2012	Hangi Tavakoli	The Documentary	F*ck Off	Producer, Lyricist, Vocalist
2012	Hangi Tavakoli	The Documentary	Her Love (feat Young Tune)	Producer, Lyricist, Vocalist
2012	Hangi Tavakoli	The Documentary	I Love Hiphop	Producer, Lyricist, Vocalist
2012	Hangi Tavakoli	The Documentary	She	Producer, Lyricist, Vocalist
2012	Hangi Tavakoli	The Documentary	Numb	Producer, Lyricist, Vocalist
2013	Hangi Tavakoli	Memorial [EP]	He Doesn't Understand	Producer, Lyricist, Vocalist
2013	Hangi Tavakoli	Memorial [EP]	Don't Give Up	Producer, Lyricist, Vocalist
2013	Hangi Tavakoli	Memorial [EP]	Like A Pomegranate	Producer, Lyricist, Vocalist
2013	Hangi Tavakoli	Memorial [EP]	Cheers To	Producer, Lyricist, Vocalist
2013	Hangi Tavakoli		Batteries Full (feat Mehran, Elijah & Jazve)	Producer, Lyricist, Vocalist
2013	Hangi Tavakoli		Flashback	Composer, Producer, Performer
2014	Hangi Tavakoli		Adult Kid	Composer, Producer, Performer
2014	Hangi Tavakoli		Jesus Loves Us	Composer, Producer, Performer
2014	Hangi Tavakoli		Dreadlocks	Composer, Producer, Performer
2014	Hangi Tavakoli		Persian Rhythm	Composer, Producer, Performer
2014	Hangi Tavakoli		It's Not Over	Composer, Producer, Performer
2014	Hangi Tavakoli		Electro Jungle	Composer, Producer, Performer
2014	Hangi Tavakoli		One	Composer, Producer, Performer
2014	Hangi Tavakoli		Dreamer	Composer, Producer, Performer
2014	Hangi Tavakoli		Fortune Run	Composer, Producer, Performer
2014	Hangi Tavakoli		God's Soldier	Composer, Producer, Performer
2014	Hangi Tavakoli		Must Go	Composer, Producer, Performer
2014	C.J. Stone		The Sun	Composer, Producer
2015	Hangi Tavakoli	Mighty Silence [EP]	Morphine	Composer, Producer, Performer
2015	Hangi Tavakoli	Mighty Silence [EP]	Long Life	Composer, Producer, Performer
2015	Hangi Tavakoli	Mighty Silence [EP]	Blueberry	Composer, Producer, Performer
2015	Hangi Tavakoli	Mighty Silence [EP]	Trip Out	Composer, Producer, Performer
2015	Hangi Tavakoli	Mighty Silence [EP]	Hunted	Composer, Producer, Performer
2015	Hangi Tavakoli	Mighty Silence [EP]	Bring It Back	Composer, Producer, Performer
2015	Hangi Tavakoli	Right Turn	Still A Kid	Composer, Producer, Performer
2015	Hangi Tavakoli	Right Turn	Motherland	Composer, Producer, Performer
2015	Hangi Tavakoli	Right Turn	Life	Composer, Producer, Performer
2015	Hangi Tavakoli	Right Turn	Fly	Composer, Producer, Performer
2015	Hangi Tavakoli	Right Turn	The Journey	Composer, Producer, Performer
2015	Hangi Tavakoli	Right Turn	Lazing	Composer, Producer, Performer
2015	Hangi Tavakoli	Right Turn	It's A Fine Day	Composer, Producer, Performer
2015	Hangi Tavakoli	Right Turn	Yes	Composer, Producer, Performer
2015	Hangi Tavakoli	Right Turn	Prelude	Composer, Producer, Performer
2015	Hangi Tavakoli	Right Turn	One Hour	Composer, Producer, Performer
2015	Hangi Tavakoli	Right Turn	The Power	Composer, Producer, Performer
2015	Hangi Tavakoli	Right Turn	Red Sky	Composer, Producer, Performer
2015	Hangi Tavakoli	Right Turn	History	Composer, Producer, Performer
2015	Hangi Tavakoli	Right Turn	Tropical	Composer, Producer, Performer
2015	Hangi Tavakoli	Broken Bones	Got Me	Composer, Producer, Performer
2015	Hangi Tavakoli	Broken Bones	What's Next	Composer, Producer, Performer
2015	Hangi Tavakoli	Broken Bones	That Day	Composer, Producer, Performer
2015	Hangi Tavakoli	Broken Bones	I Knock	Composer, Producer, Performer
2015	Hangi Tavakoli	Broken Bones	1000 Questions	Composer, Producer, Performer
2015	Hangi Tavakoli	Broken Bones	Faith	Composer, Producer, Performer
2015	Hangi Tavakoli	Broken Bones	God	Composer, Producer, Performer
2015	Hangi Tavakoli	Broken Bones	Don't Stop	Composer, Producer, Performer
2015	Hangi Tavakoli	Broken Bones	Nightmare	Composer, Producer, Performer
2015	Hangi Tavakoli	Broken Bones	Tears	Composer, Producer, Performer
2015	Hangi Tavakoli	Broken Bones	No Time	Composer, Producer, Performer
2015	Hangi Tavakoli	Broken Bones	Discharge	Composer, Producer, Performer
2015	Hangi Tavakoli	Broken Bones	Thoughts	Composer, Producer, Performer
2015	Hangi Tavakoli	Broken Bones	Healing	Composer, Producer, Performer
2015	Hangi Tavakoli	Broken Bones	Mind Game	Composer, Producer, Performer
2015	Hangi Tavakoli	Quarter Century	Stand Tall	Composer, Producer, Lyricist
2015	Hangi Tavakoli	Quarter Century	So Sad	Composer, Producer, Lyricist
2015	Hangi Tavakoli	Quarter Century	Take My Hand	Composer, Producer, Lyricist
2015	Hangi Tavakoli	Quarter Century	Welcome	Composer, Producer, Performer
2015	Hangi Tavakoli	Quarter Century	Process	Composer, Producer, Performer
2015	Hangi Tavakoli	Quarter Century	25 Years	Composer, Producer, Performer
2015	Hangi Tavakoli	Quarter Century	Looking Inside	Composer, Producer, Performer
2015	Hangi Tavakoli	Quarter Century	Enigma	Composer, Producer, Performer
2015	Hangi Tavakoli	Quarter Century	Save Our Souls	Composer, Producer, Performer
2015	Hangi Tavakoli	Quarter Century	Yesterday	Composer, Producer, Performer
2015	Hangi Tavakoli	Quarter Century	Dream Time	Composer, Producer, Performer
2015	Hangi Tavakoli	Quarter Century	Nobody	Composer, Producer, Performer
2015	Hangi Tavakoli	Quarter Century	Badman	Composer, Producer, Performer
2015	Hangi Tavakoli	Quarter Century	Please Me	Composer, Producer, Performer
2015	Hangi Tavakoli	Quarter Century	45th Day	Composer, Producer, Performer
2015	Hangi Tavakoli	Quarter Century	Gone	Composer, Producer, Performer
2015	Hangi Tavakoli	City Lights	Tehran	Composer, Producer, Performer
2015	Hangi Tavakoli	City Lights	One Minute (feat. Lokka)	Composer, Producer, Performer
2015	Hangi Tavakoli	City Lights	And Two	Composer, Producer, Performer
2015	Hangi Tavakoli	City Lights	Wake Up	Composer, Producer, Performer
2015	Hangi Tavakoli	City Lights	Green	Composer, Producer, Performer
2015	Hangi Tavakoli	City Lights	Midnight	Composer, Producer, Performer
2015	Hangi Tavakoli	City Lights	Monkey	Composer, Producer, Performer
2015	Hangi Tavakoli	City Lights	Cool Pool	Composer, Producer, Performer
2015	Hangi Tavakoli	City Lights	Tower	Composer, Producer, Performer
2015	Hangi Tavakoli		Dynamic	Composer, Producer, Performer
2015	Hangi Tavakoli		Again	Composer, Producer, Performer
2015	Hangi Tavakoli		F**k You	Composer, Producer, Performer
2015	Hangi Tavakoli		They Are Coming	Composer, Producer, Performer
2015	Hangi Tavakoli		God of Gods	Composer, Producer, Performer
2015	Hangi Tavakoli		Persian Prince	Composer, Producer, Performer
2015	Hangi Tavakoli		Honor	Composer, Producer, Performer
2015	Hangi Tavakoli		Separation	Composer, Producer, Performer
2015	Hangi Tavakoli		Oh Hey Hi	Composer, Producer, Performer
2015	Hangi Tavakoli		Hostel	Composer, Producer, Performer
2015	Hangi Tavakoli		The Past	Composer, Producer, Performer
2015	Hangi Tavakoli		Stay Cool	Composer, Producer, Performer
2015	Hangi Tavakoli		Persepolis	Composer, Producer, Performer
2015	Hangi Tavakoli		All Alone	Composer, Producer, Performer
2015	Hangi Tavakoli		Rabbit	Composer, Producer, Performer
2015	Hangi Tavakoli		Silky Strings	Composer, Producer, Performer
2015	Rei Yap		You Are Not Here	Composer, Producer, Lyricist
2016	Angelica Muk		Now	Composer, Producer, Lyricist
2016	Janice Choy		Recover	Composer, Producer
2016	Janice Choy		Farewell	Composer, Producer
2016	Xu Bei		Expect	Composer, Producer
2016	Lya Ng		The Sea	Composer, Producer
2016	Lya Ng		Fine Alone	Composer, Producer
2016	Lya Ng		Blank (feat Janice Choy, Xu Bei)	Composer, Producer
2016	Hangi Tavakoli		My World	Composer, Producer, Lyricist, Vocalist
2016	Hangi Tavakoli		Scars (feat Lya Ng)	Composer, Producer, Lyricist, Vocalist
2016	Hangi Tavakoli	Peak	Me Without You	Composer, Producer, Performer
2016	Hangi Tavakoli	Peak	Close Your Eyes	Composer, Producer, Performer
2016	Hangi Tavakoli	Peak	New Me	Composer, Producer, Performer
2016	Hangi Tavakoli	Peak	Evolution	Composer, Producer, Performer
2016	Hangi Tavakoli	Peak	10 Years	Composer, Producer, Performer
2016	Hangi Tavakoli	Peak	Believe	Composer, Producer, Performer
2016	Hangi Tavakoli	Peak	Dark Romance	Composer, Producer, Performer
2016	Hangi Tavakoli	Peak	Wordless	Composer, Producer, Performer
2016	Hangi Tavakoli	Peak	Colors	Composer, Producer, Performer
2016	Hangi Tavakoli	Ignored	Mountain	Composer, Producer, Performer
2016	Hangi Tavakoli	Ignored	Reflection	Composer, Producer, Performer
2016	Hangi Tavakoli	Ignored	Stone	Composer, Producer, Performer
2016	Hangi Tavakoli	Ignored	Hatred	Composer, Producer, Performer
2016	Hangi Tavakoli	Ignored	Growing	Composer, Producer, Performer
2017	Lya Ng	New Breathe	New Breathe	Composer, Producer
2017	Lya Ng	New Breathe	Code Of Love	Composer, Producer
2017	Lya Ng	New Breathe	Caught Sight Of Loneliness	Composer, Producer
2017	Lya Ng	New Breathe	Willing To	Composer, Producer
2017	Lya Ng	New Breathe	Lazy To Guess	Composer, Producer
2017	Lya Ng	New Breathe	I Don't Wanna Love Anymore	Composer, Producer
2017	Lya Ng	New Breathe	Repetition	Composer, Producer
2017	Lya Ng	New Breathe	Little Puppy (feat Hangi Tavakoli)	Composer, Producer, Co-Lyricist, Vocalist
2017	Garrick Kiew		Hear Me Out	Composer, Producer, Lyricist
2017	Bryan Toro		These Days	Composer, Producer, Lyricist
2017	Lawrence Hiew		Happiness Script	Composer, Producer
2017	Daniel D'min		I Am Me	Composer, Producer
2017	Vanessa Goh		Wonderland	Composer, Producer, Co-Lyricist
2017	Vanessa Goh		Stay	Composer, Producer, Co-Lyricist
2017	Hangi Tavakoli		June Seventh	Composer, Producer, Performer
2017	Hangi Tavakoli		Maybe One Day	Composer, Producer, Performer
2017	Hangi Tavakoli		Invisible Man	Composer, Producer, Performer
2017	Hangi Tavakoli		Anti Social	Composer, Producer, Performer
2017	Hangi Tavakoli		Closed Doors	Composer, Producer, Performer
2017	Hangi Tavakoli		About Last Night	Composer, Producer, Performer
2018	Dilly Del		Found Your Replacement (feat Vanessa Goh)	Producer
2018	Dilly Del		Party With Me (feat Aliff Hanif)	Producer
2018	Dilly Del		Winter Daydreams (feat. Sam Veil)	Songwriter, Producer
2018	Dilly Del	Elevate	Backwards	Composer, Producer, Sound Engineer
2018	Dilly Del	Elevate	It's Just You & Me	Composer, Producer, Sound Engineer
2018	Dilly Del	Elevate	Can't Let You Go	Executive Producer, Sound Engineer
2018	Dilly Del	Elevate	Baila Conmigo	Executive Producer, Sound Engineer
2018	Dilly Del	Elevate	Crib	Executive Producer, Sound Engineer
2018	Dilly Del	Elevate	You	Executive Producer, Sound Engineer
2018	Dilly Del	Elevate	Dope Chick	Executive Producer, Sound Engineer
2018	Dilly Del	Elevate	Than It Already Is	Executive Producer, Sound Engineer
2018	Dilly Del	Elevate	Losing You	Executive Producer, Sound Engineer
2018	Dilly Del	Elevate	All Back	Executive Producer, Sound Engineer
2018	Dilly Del	Elevate	Sex Tape	Executive Producer, Sound Engineer
2018	Dilly Del	Elevate	Real Fine	Executive Producer, Sound Engineer
2018	Dilly Del	Elevate	Ten	Executive Producer, Sound Engineer
2018	Aaron Xiang Hua		Fine Line (feat Hangi Tavakoli)	Composer, Producer, Co-Writer, Vocalist
2018	Aaron Xiang Hua		Cactus Love	Composer, Producer, Co-Writer, Vocalist
2018	Aaron Xiang Hua		Once	Producer, Co-Writer
2018	Vanessa Goh		Goodbye Forever	Composer, Producer
2018	Vanessa Goh		Passerby	Composer, Producer
2018	Vanessa Goh		Glass Heart (feat Dilly Del)	Composer, Producer
2018	Vanessa Goh		Silly Child	Composer, Producer
2018	Vanessa Goh		Brand New Day	Composer, Producer
2018	Vanessa Goh		Trust Issues (feat Hangi Tavakoli)	Composer, Producer, Co-writer, Vocalist
2018	Daniel D'min		Awaken, Love	Composer, Producer
2018	Sam Veil		Delete	Co-Writer, Producer
2018	Sam Veil		All Time Low	Co-Writer, Producer
2018	Hangi Tavakoli		Reaching The Stars	Composer, Producer, Performer
2018	Hangi Tavakoli		Forever Mine	Composer, Producer, Performer
2018	Hangi Tavakoli		The Seventh Month	Composer, Producer, Performer
2018	Hangi Tavakoli		Memories	Composer, Producer, Performer
2018	Hangi Tavakoli		After Me	Composer, Producer, Performer
2018	Hangi Tavakoli		Inhuman	Composer, Producer, Performer
2018	Hangi Tavakoli		Safe	Composer, Producer, Performer
2018	Hangi Tavakoli		Blood	Composer, Producer, Performer
2018	Hangi Tavakoli		These Days	Composer, Producer, Performer
2018	Hangi Tavakoli		It's Always Been You	Composer, Producer, Performer
2018	Hangi Tavakoli		Invincible Sentence	Composer, Producer, Performer
2018	Hangi Tavakoli		You, Me, Us	Composer, Producer, Performer
2018	Hangi Tavakoli		Shadows	Composer, Producer, Performer
2018	Hangi Tavakoli		The Secret	Composer, Producer, Performer
2018	Hangi Tavakoli	Bitter Smiles	Promises	Composer, Producer, Performer
2018	Hangi Tavakoli	Bitter Smiles	Whiskey	Composer, Producer, Performer
2018	Hangi Tavakoli	Bitter Smiles	Whisper	Composer, Producer, Performer
2018	Hangi Tavakoli	Bitter Smiles	Mother	Composer, Producer, Performer
2018	Hangi Tavakoli	Bitter Smiles	You	Composer, Producer, Performer
2018	Hangi Tavakoli	Bitter Smiles	Eastern Girl	Composer, Producer, Performer
2018	Hangi Tavakoli	Bitter Smiles	Love And Hope	Composer, Producer, Performer
2018	Hangi Tavakoli	Bitter Smiles	When A Man Cries	Composer, Producer, Performer
2018	Hangi Tavakoli	Bitter Smiles	Unspoken	Composer, Producer, Performer
2018	Hangi Tavakoli	Bitter Smiles	If You Knew	Composer, Producer, Performer
2018	Hangi Tavakoli	Personal	64 Days	Composer, Producer, Performer
2018	Hangi Tavakoli	Personal	Dream	Composer, Producer, Performer
2018	Hangi Tavakoli	Personal	Loneliness	Composer, Producer, Performer
2018	Hangi Tavakoli	Personal	Goodbye	Composer, Producer, Performer
2018	Hangi Tavakoli	Personal	Love Letter	Composer, Producer, Performer
2018	Hangi Tavakoli	Personal	Restless	Composer, Producer, Performer
2018	Hangi Tavakoli	Personal	New Light	Composer, Producer, Performer
2018	Hangi Tavakoli	When I Was Younger	Broken Story	Composer, Producer, Performer
2018	Hangi Tavakoli	When I Was Younger	Dad	Composer, Producer, Performer
2018	Hangi Tavakoli	When I Was Younger	Foolishness	Composer, Producer, Performer
2018	Hangi Tavakoli	When I Was Younger	Eternity	Composer, Producer, Performer
2018	Hangi Tavakoli	When I Was Younger	Rotation	Composer, Producer, Performer
2018	Hangi Tavakoli	When I Was Younger	King Without the Throne	Composer, Producer, Performer
2018	Hangi Tavakoli	When I Was Younger	The Truth	Composer, Producer, Performer
2018	Hangi Tavakoli	When I Was Younger	Dedication	Composer, Producer, Performer
2018	Hangi Tavakoli	Fragile	Lonely	Composer, Producer, Performer
2018	Hangi Tavakoli	Fragile	My Silence	Composer, Producer, Performer
2018	Hangi Tavakoli	Fragile	Emotions	Composer, Producer, Performer
2018	Hangi Tavakoli	Fragile	Meaning Of Life	Composer, Producer, Performer
2018	Hangi Tavakoli	Fragile	Inner World	Composer, Producer, Performer
2018	Hangi Tavakoli	Fragile	Lullaby	Composer, Producer, Performer
2018	Hangi Tavakoli	Fragile	Your Eyes	Composer, Producer, Performer
2018	Hangi Tavakoli	Fragile	The Truth Of Future	Composer, Producer, Performer
2018	Hangi Tavakoli	Fragile	Ever Lasting Love	Composer, Producer, Performer
2019	Sam Veil		Incomplete	Co-writer, Producer, Lyricist, Rapper
2019	Dilly Del		Stars To You	Executive Producer, Mix Engineer
2019	Hangi Tavakoli		Hand In Hand	Composer, Producer, Performer
2019	Hangi Tavakoli		A Paradox Called Humanity	Composer, Producer, Performer
2019	Hangi Tavakoli	Kind of Nothing	Never Let Me Go	Composer, Producer, Performer
2019	Hangi Tavakoli	Kind of Nothing	Lush Life	Composer, Producer, Performer
2019	Hangi Tavakoli	Kind of Nothing	Kind of Nothing	Composer, Producer, Performer
2019	Hangi Tavakoli	Kind of Nothing	Darkness Matters	Composer, Producer, Performer
2019	Hangi Tavakoli	Kind of Nothing	Circle of Death	Composer, Producer, Performer
2019	Hangi Tavakoli	Beautiful Strength	Everything I Ever Had	Composer, Producer, Performer
2019	Hangi Tavakoli	Beautiful Strength	Hold My Hands	Composer, Producer, Performer
2019	Hangi Tavakoli	Beautiful Strength	In My Heart	Composer, Producer, Performer
2019	Hangi Tavakoli	Beautiful Strength	The Rain	Composer, Producer, Performer
2019	Hangi Tavakoli	Beautiful Strength	Sinful Angel	Composer, Producer, Performer
2019	Hangi Tavakoli	Beautiful Strength	I Celebrate You	Composer, Producer, Performer
2019	Hangi Tavakoli	Beautiful Strength	Beautiful Strength	Composer, Producer, Performer
2019	Hangi Tavakoli	Beautiful Strength	Be By My Side	Composer, Producer, Performer
2019	Hangi Tavakoli	Beautiful Strength	Fearful	Composer, Producer, Performer
2019	Hangi Tavakoli	Beautiful Strength	One Night Without You	Composer, Producer, Performer
