= Farzane Zamen =

Iranian musician, producer and songwriter

Farzane Zamen, (فرزانه ضامن) is an Iranian musician, producer and songwriter. She has released albums and singles in Persian as well as single records in English.

She has been interested in music since her childhood, and she started learning music professionally when she was 17 by playing classical guitar and learning music theory lessons. She had started writing lyrics by the age of 16, writing in both English and Persian languages. After entering Arts college she gave up classical guitar and began playing piano and keyboard.

In July 2009, she released her first single in English You've gone cold tonight on the web, which tells of an emotional gulf between lovers. The received over 2000 downloads from websites such as 4shared. For her English language songs she uses the artistic name 'Autumn Girl'.

Her first album was published in 2010; the first single from that was Persian Rooze Paeezi in November 2010. That year she also competed for the online Zirzamin Music Award by submitting her punk rock song Love Affair. The top twenty entries were featured in a compilation album, and Zamen was placed eighth.

Her first music video, Khodahafez, released in 2012, was a hit in Iran and the Iranian diaspora. It is a song about leaving Iran for foreign countries to learn freedom and how to live again, a reason why many young people felt they identified strongly with the song. Farzane does all of the composing and arrangement of her songs herself in her own home studio. Her music blends rock, indie and pop into one mainstream sound.

Because of Islamic law as it is applied in Iran, women are not allowed to sing in public, so Zamen has no opportunity to perform her music in her home country. During December 2015 she was on a one-month residency in Nordic countries arranged by Safe Muse (a Norwegian organization) to perform and work with fellow musicians there, and to get the opportunity to play in public. She performed in Bergen, Norway and Malmö, Sweden.

In 2017 she was awarded a prestigious Artist Protection Fund fellowship for artist residency hosted by Centre for Contemporary Arts of Glasgow, she's been based in Glasgow since then and been active in Scotland's music scene.
