= Davood Azad =

Iranian musician

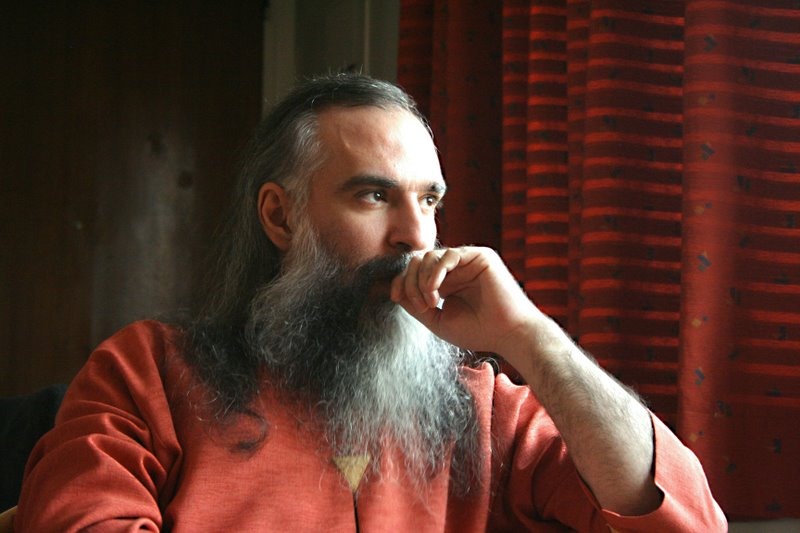

Background information
- Born: 6 October 1963 (age 63); Urmia, Iran
- Occupations: Singer, musician & composer
- Instruments: Tar, setar, tanbour, oud, daf, robab

Davood Azad (born 6 October 1963) is an Iranian singer, multi-instrumental musician and composer who sings both Iranian classical music and Azeri folk music. He is the first Iranian lecturer invited to Oxford University to lecture about Iranian music and its forms.

Davood Azad was born in Urmia, Azerbaijan. He is an ethnic Iranian Azerbaijani multi-instrumentalist and vocalist in Iranian classical music, Azerbaijani folk music, Ancient Persian music, and Persian Sufi music.

In his work "The Divan of Rumi & Bach" Azad joins Iranian Traditional music with Bach's famous melodies.

== See also ==
- Mohammad Reza Shajarian
- Music of Iran
- List of Iranian musicians
