= Shahkar Bineshpajooh =

Iranian musician (born 1972)

- شاهکار بینش‌پژوه
- Born: Tehran, Iran
- Citizenship: Iran, United States
- Occupations: Poet, music composer, singer
- Known for: Iranian rap music album Eskenas
- Musical career
- Website: Official website

Shahkar Bineshpajooh (Persian: شاهکار بینش‌پژوه; born in Tehran, Iran) is an Iranian music artist based in the United States since 2012. A singer, composer, and poet, he has performed at venues including the Nokia Theatre (later known as Microsoft Theater) in Los Angeles in 2014 and 2019, and the Warner Theatre in Washington, D.C. His live productions have included large orchestras and choirs.

Bineshpajooh received a doctorate in urban planning and was a lecturer in Iran when he released the rap album Eskenas in 2004. His recordings of six rap songs on Eskenas are considered among the earliest examples of Iranian rap music. According to the BBC News, he was known as the "Dapper Rapper" for "his smart suits and elegant lifestyle". Using rap as a platform for social criticism, he covered topics such as unemployment, poverty, and Westernization. It took four years for the Ministry of Culture to approve the release of his album.
