= Kaveh Afagh =

Iranian singer (born 1983)

Kaveh Afagh کاوه آفاق
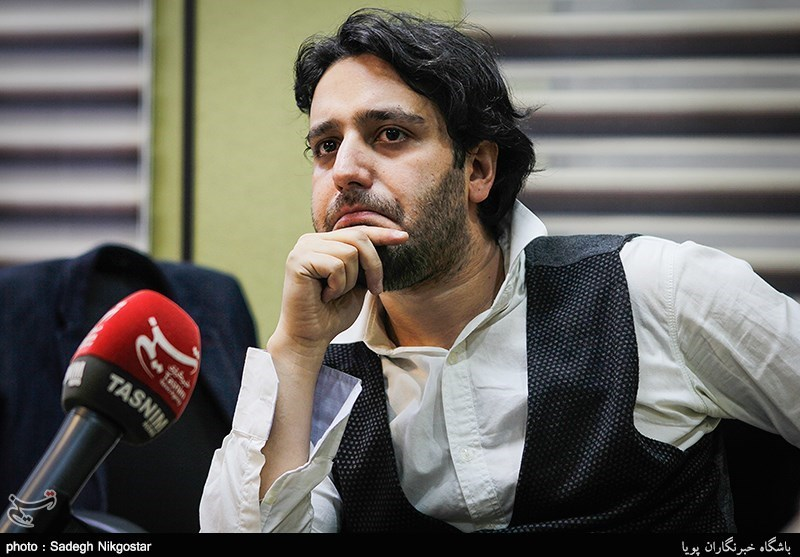

Background information
- Born: May 1, 1983 (age 43); Tehran, Iran
- Origin: Iran
- Genres: Pop rock
- Occupations: Singer, composer, songwriter, arranger, guitar player, actor, painter
- Instruments: Guitar, vocals
- Years active: 2002–present

Kaveh Afagh (Persian: کاوه آفاق) (born May 1, 1983) is an Iranian singer, songwriter, arranger, guitarist as well as an actor and painter.

== Career ==
Afagh learned to play classical guitar as a child. By age 15, he knew how to play the electric guitar, and became interested in rock music. He began composing his own songs, completing several pieces by age 17. In 2010, Afagh won the 2nd Underground World Music Festival with his song Ghesseye Zirzamin, which featured Yas and Arad Aria. He received the Best Performance Award in the Contemporary Music category at the 5th Iranian Resistance Festival in 2012. In 2017, Afagh published the first Persian rock songbook, Tehran – 57. Afagh is also the founder of band The Ways. With them, he has composed several songs for Iranian plays and movies.

Afagh is the first rock singer in post-Islamic Revolution Iran to obtain an activity license, which he obtained after being banned for ten years from performing. He remains one of the country's most prominent rock singers.

Aside from his music, Afagh has also exhibited his artwork in several art galleries. His artwork is influenced by music and social issues.

== Discography ==
=== Albums ===
- Stress – 2010
- Dances with Pills – 2016
- Shawl – 2018
- Lotus – 2019
