= Babak Jahanbakhsh =

Iranian singer

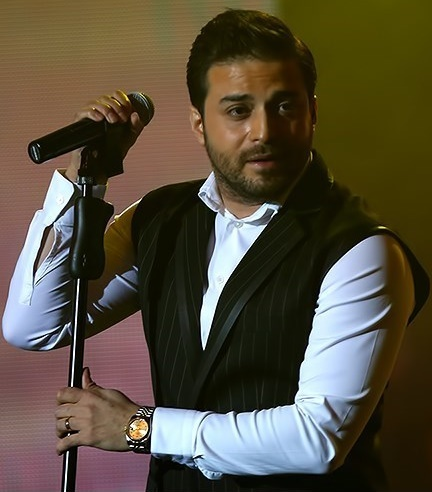
- Born: Ali Jahanbakhsh علی جهانبخش; 21 March 1983 (age 43); Bochum, Germany
- Occupations: Singer; composer; songwriter
- Spouse: Paria Partovi (m. 2017)
- Children: 1
- Musical career
- Genres: Persian pop
- Instruments: Guitar; piano
- Years active: 2005–present

Babak Jahanbakhsh (Persian: بابک جهانبخش; born 21 March 1983) is an Iranian pop singer.

== Biography ==
Born in Bochum, Germany, Jahanbakhsh started playing the piano at the age of five under the supervision of a German teacher at the Free Music School in Bochum. After finishing his father's education and returning to Iran, he became more interested in music and pursued Oriental music more seriously. The first person to encourage him to become a singer was the old composer Mojtaba Mirzadeh. He underwent new training courses and in 1997, at the age of 14, he received his official license from the Islamic Republic of Iran Broadcasting, which at that time was approved by Mohammad Ali Moallem, and in the same year he recorded a track for the Islamic Republic of Iran Broadcasting.

== Discography ==
=== Albums ===
Production of his first album began in 2003, and in 2005 he released the album "Chi Shodeh", and in the same year he was selected as the second phenomenon of the year. He entered a new phase of his artistic career with the release of the album Mano Baroon. The song "Mano Baroon" from this album has been sung with Reza Sadeghi. This song became the 13th in the list of the top 100 songs of 2012 on Radio Javan.

- Chi Shodeh (Late December 2005)

Number	Song name	Songwriter	Composer	Arrangement
1	Midonam	Salya Houshmand	Babak Jahanbakhsh	Shahin Khosrowabadi
2	Chi Shodeh	Roya Majd Aria	Payam Houshmand	Shahin Khosrowabadi
3	Yadeteh	Davood Basiri	Shahin Khosrowabadi	Shahin Khosrowabadi
4	Hozour	Behzad Jafari	Babak Jahanbakhsh	Shahin Khosrowabadi
5	Khorshid O Mah	Payam Houshmand	Babak Jahanbakhsh	Shahin Khosrowabadi
6	Madar	Behzad Jafari	Babak Jahanbakhsh	Shahin Khosrowabadi
7	Zemzemeh	Faramarz Jafari	Babak Jahanbakhsh and Shahin Khosrowabadi	Shahin Khosrowabadi
8	Tako Tanha	Faramarz Jafari	Turkish melody	Shahin Khosrowabadi
9	KhodaHafez	Masoud Houshmand	Payam Houshmand	Shahin Khosrowabadi
10	Yeki Bood Yeki Nabood	Davood Basiri	Babak Jahanbakhsh	Shahin Khosrowabadi
11	Namehrabooni	Faramarz Jafari	Babak Jahanbakhsh	Shahin Khosrowabadi
12	Chi Shodeh (Remix)			

- Bi Esm (12 November 2008)

Number	Song name	Songwriter	Composer	Arrangement
1	Ageh Nabashi	Babak Sahraei	Babak Jahanbakhsh	Pouria Heydari
2	Faal	Mahdieh Arab	Ali Samadi	Pouria Heydari
3	Rasmesh Nabood	Bahaareh Rasoolzadegan	Babak Jahanbakhsh	Pouria Heydari
4	Boro Digeh	Taraneh Mokaram	Babak Jahanbakhsh	Pouria Heydari
5	Zemestoon	Naghmeh Ghasemi	Babak Jahanbakhsh	Pouria Heydari
6	Be Ki Dari Fekr Mikoni	Maryam Asadi	Babak Jahanbakhsh	Pouria Heydari
7	Az Cheshme Man	Hamid Reza Samadi	Babak Jahanbakhsh	Pouria Heydari
8	Tazegia	Ali Bahraini	Babak Jahanbakhsh	Pouria Heydari
9	Chi Nasibet Misheh	Maryam Asadi	Babak Jahanbakhsh	Pouria Heydari
10	Mimiram	Mahdieh Arab	Babak Jahanbakhsh	Pouria Heydari
11	Fekresho Kon	Dariush Shahriari	Babak Jahanbakhsh	Pouria Heydari

- Ehsas (20 June 2010)

Number	Song name	Songwriter	Composer	Arrangement
1	Ba to	Amir Masoud Mirdamadi	Babak Jahanbakhsh	Babak Jahanbakhsh
2	Ehsas	Zeynab Alagheh	Payam Houshmand	Payam Houshmand
3	Rafti O Shekasti	Zeynab Alagheh	Babak Jahanbakhsh	Payam Houshmand
4	Kojaei	Amir Masoud Mirdamadi	Payam Houshmand	Payam Houshmand
5	Yade To	Dariush Shahriari	Babak Vaziri	Pouria Heydari
6	Bad Nist	Maryam Asadi	Babak Jahanbakhsh	Payam Houshmand
7	Bi Setareh	Somayeh Kaviani	Babak Jahanbakhsh	Pouria Heydari
8	BiKhodi	Maryam Asadi	Babak Jahanbakhsh	Pouria Heydari
9	Be Kasi Che	Naghmeh Ghasemi	Babak Jahanbakhsh	Pouria Heydari
10	Bakhshidamet	Babak Sahraei	Babak Jahanbakhsh	Payam Houshmand
11	Panaham Bedeh	Babak Sahraei	Babak Jahanbakhsh	Pouria Heydari

- Zendegie Man (7 June 2011)

Number	Song name	Songwriter	Composer	Arrangement
1	Bavar Kon	Babak Jahanbakhsh	Babak Jahanbakhsh	Amir Hossein Oveysi
2	Zendegie Man	Mohsen Shirali	Babak Jahanbakhsh	Anoushirvan Taghavi
3	Dooset Daram	Babak Jahanbakhsh	Babak Jahanbakhsh	Babak Jahanbakhsh
4	Hazioun	Ali Bahraini	Payam Houshmand	Payam Houshmand
5	Asheghi	Maryam Asadi	Babak Jahanbakhsh	Anoushirvan Taghavi
6	Afsaneh	Mohsen Shirali	Babak Jahanbakhsh	Amir Hossein Oveisi
7	Adat	Salya Houshmand	Payam Houshmand	Babak Jahanbakhsh
8	Toro Mikham	Maryam Asadi	Anoushirvan Taghavi	Anoushirvan Taghavi
9	Gozashteh	Roya Majd Aria	Babak Jahanbakhsh	Anoushirvan Taghavi
10	Angizeh	Amir Masoud Mirdamadi	Payam Houshmand	Payam Houshmand

- Mano Baroon (11 July 2012)

Number	Song name	Songwriter	Composer	Arrangement
1	Hameh Donyam	Yaha Kashani	Babak Jahanbakhsh	Kooshan Haddad
2	Didani Shodi	Seyyed Mohammad Kazemi	Payam Houshmand	Payam Houshmand
3	Ey Del	Babak Jahanbakhsh and Payam Houshmand	Babak Jahanbakhsh	Babak Jahanbakhsh
4	Movazebe Khodet Bash	Alireza Piroozi	Babak Jahanbakhsh	Saeed Modarres
5	Mano Baroon	Babak Jahanbakhsh	Babak Jahanbakhsh	Babak Jahanbakhsh
6	Be Khodet Bakhtam	Mohsen Shirali	Babak Jahanbakhsh	Kooshan Haddad
7	Ideal	Mohsen Shirali	Babak Jahanbakhsh	Amir Fathi
8	Eghrar	Mohsen Shirali	Babak Jahanbakhsh	Hooman Namdari
9	Ey Kash	Seyyed Mohammad Kazemi	Babak Jahanbakhsh	Ali Varian
10	Dobareh (Remix)	Ali Bahraini	Babak Jahanbakhsh	Payam Houshmand
11	Mano Baroon (Together with Reza Sadeghi)	Babak Jahanbakhsh	Babak Jahanbakhsh	Pouria Heydari

- Oxygen (13 August 2013)

Number	Song name	Songwriter	Composer	Arrangement
1	Oxygen	Mohsen Shirali	Babak Jahanbakhsh	Kooshan Haddad
2	Mano Negah Kon	Yaha Kashani	Babak Jahanbakhsh	Afshin Khajehnejad (No mention of the name in the physical version)
3	Ta Hala Shodeh	Babak Jahanbakhsh	Babak Jahanbakhsh	Babak Jahanbakhsh
4	Ye Chizi Migi	Ali Bahraini	Payam Houshmand	Payam Houshmand
5	Baseh Digeh	Taraneh Mokaram	Babak Jahanbakhsh	Reza Tajbakhsh
6	Raz	Mohsen Shirali	Babak Jahanbakhsh	Babak Jahanbakhsh
7	Che Hese Khoobi	Yaha Kashani	Babak Jahanbakhsh	Kooshan Haddad
8	Royaye Shirin	Mohsen Shirali	Babak Jahanbakhsh	Anoushirvan Taghavi
9	Azaab	Mohsen Shirali	Babak Jahanbakhsh	Ashkan Abrun
10	Faghat Be Eshghe To	Maryam Asadi	Emad Talebzadeh	Moein Rahbar
11	Rooz Maregi	Bita Taei	Payam Houshmand	Payam Houshmand
12	Khooneh	Yaha Kashani	Babak Jahanbakhsh	Reza Tajbakhsh

- Madare Bigharari (14 September 2014)

Number	Song name	Songwriter	Composer	Arrangement
1	Mojezeh	Mohsen Shirali	Amir Milad Nikzad	Amir Milad Nikzad
2	Madare Bigharari	Mohsen Shirali	Babak Jahanbakhsh	Amir Hossein Oveisi
3	Hamin Ye Bar	Mohsen Shirali	Babak Jahanbakhsh	Reza Tajbakhsh
4	Jahtalab	Mohsen Shirali	Babak Jahanbakhsh	Niman
5	Ostooreh	Mohsen Shirali	Anoushirvan Taghavi	Anoushirvan Taghavi
6	Havaset Nist	Mohsen Shirali	Babak Jahanbakhsh	Masoud Homayouni
7	Asheghtar	Babak Jahanbakhsh	Babak Jahanbakhsh	Anoushirvan Taghavi
8	Eshtebah	Mohsen Shirali	Babak Jahanbakhsh	Reza Tajbakhsh
9	Honarmand	Mohsen Shirali	Babak Jahanbakhsh	Amir Hossein Oveisi
10	Eteraf	Mohsen Shirali	Babak Jahanbakhsh	Amir Hossein Kashanian
11	Hoviyat	Mohsen Shirali	Babak Jahanbakhsh	Masoud Homayouni
12	Deltangi	Mohsen Shirali	Babak Jahanbakhsh	Moein Rahbar

- Halam Khobeh (11 May 2016)

Number	Song name	Songwriter	Composer	Arrangement
1	Halam Khobeh	Amir Masoud Mirdamadi	Babak Jahanbakhsh	Amir Hossein Oveysi
2	Tasmim	Hamed Sufipour	Babak Vaziri	Aron Hosseini
3	To Ro Doost Daram	Ali Estiri	Babak Jahanbakhsh	Anoushirvan Taghavi
4	Paeiz	Babak Jahanbakhsh	Babak Jahanbakhsh	Reza Tajbakhsh
5	Jazebeh	Amir Masoud Mirdamadi	Payam Houshmand	Payam Houshmand
6	Shayad	Babak Babaei	Asef Aria	Masoud Homayouni
7	Khas	Mohammad Kazemi	Amir Ali Zamanian	Amir Hossein Oveysi
8	Hargez	Mohsen Shirali	Babak Jahanbakhsh	Amir Hossein Oveysi
9	Bayad Beram	Mahshad Arab	Payam Houshmand	Payam Houshmand
10	Mitarsam	Mehran Hadian	Babak Jahanbakhsh	Ashkan Abrun

=== Singles ===
- These songs have entered the music market since 2005:

Release date	Song name	Songwriter	Composer	Arrangement	Description
5 March 2007	Azam Doori Nakon	Maryam Asadi	Babak Jahanbakhsh	Pouria Heydari	Together with Pouria Heydari
	Baghe Blour				
	Sepideh				
	Chikar Konam				
	Dobareh				
	Hamisheh				
	Man Ke Bavaram Nemisheh				
	Payan				Together with Pouria Heydari
10 April 2007	Fekresho Kon	Dariush Shahriari	Babak Jahanbakhsh	Pouria Heydari	Later on Bi Esm album
	Tazegia	Ali Bahraini	Babak Jahanbakhsh	Pouria Heydari	Later on Bi Esm album
	Khatereh				
2009	Kaseye Gandom	Hamed Askari	Mehran Khalesi	Mehran Khalesi	from Hasht multi-singer album
2009	Darya				In the movie Do Khahar
2009	Panaham Bedeh	Babak Sahraei	Babak Jahanbakhsh	Pouria Heydari	In the movie Do Khahar and later in the album Ehsas
2009	Mano Az Yad Bebar				In the movie Do Khahar
2009	Tablohaye Naghashi (Demo)				In the movie Do Khahar
2009	Tamoomeh				In the movie Do Khahar
2009	Tiko Tak				In the movie Do Khahar
2009	Sakhteh				
2011	Dooset Daram	Babak Jahanbakhsh	Babak Jahanbakhsh	Babak Jahanbakhsh	Later on the album Zendegie Man
2012	Ashegham Kon (With Seyyed Ali Zia declamation)	Amir Hossein Allahyari	Babak Jahanbakhsh	Babak Jahanbakhsh	Nimrooz program opening theme
2012	Atisham Bezan	Mohsen Shirali	Babak Jahanbakhsh	Amir Hossein Oveisi	Mixing and mastering by Arash Pakzad
2011	Delsard Nasho Az Eshgh	Mohsen Shirali	Babak Jahanbakhsh	Anoushirvan Taghavi	From the multi-singer album Khas
2012	Bi To Mimiram	Yaha Kashani	Babak Jahanbakhsh	Babak Jahanbakhsh	Mixing and mastering by Arash Pakzad
2012	To Cheshmaye Mani	Mohsen Shirali	Babak Jahanbakhsh	Behzad Gorjipour	Mixing and mastering by Arash Pakzad
21 December 2013	Barf	Yaha Kashani	Babak Jahanbakhsh	Reza Tajbakhsh	Mixing and mastering by Arash Pakzad - Barf Mibareh program opening theme (Yalda night)
2014	Mano Sazam	Babak Jahanbakhsh	Babak Jahanbakhsh	Kooshan Haddad	Mixing and mastering by Arash Pakzad
2015	Sedaye Eshgh	Mehrzad Amirkhani	Farshid Adhami	Moein Rahbar	
18 April 2015	Faramoosh Kardam	Babak Jahanbakhsh	Babak Jahanbakhsh	Anoushirvan Taghavi	
2016	Mesle Hame	Pouria Metabean	Anoushirvan Taghavi	Anoushirvan Taghavi	Mixing and mastering by Arash Pakzad
2016	Ye Saat، Fekre Rahat	Mohsen Shirali			
2016	Roozaye Abri	Parisa Siar			
2016	Manzoomeye Ehsas	Mohsen Shirali			
2017	Cafe Paeiz	Mehdi Ayoubi	Milad Babaei		
2017	Boye Eidi	Mehdi Ayoubi			
2017	Divooneh Jan	Mohsen Shirali			
2017	To Ke Hassasi	Mehdi Ayoubi			Together with Reza Sadeghi
2017	Havvaye Man	Mehdi Ayoubi	Babak Jahanbakhsh	Moein Rahbar	
2017	Parizad	Mohsen Shirali	Babak Jahanbakhsh		
2018	To Hamooni Ke	Babak Babaei	Babak Jahanbakhsh		
2018	To Injaei	Yaha Kashani	Babak Jahanbakhsh		
2018	Ey Vay	Mohsen Shirali	Babak Jahanbakhsh	Moein Rahbar	
2018	Man Hastam	Mohsen Shirali	Babak Jahanbakhsh	Moein Rahbar	
2018	Sheydaei	Mohsen Shirali	Babak Jahanbakhsh	Moein Rahbar	
2019	Zibaye Bitab	Mohsen Shirali	Babak Jahanbakhsh	Moein Rahbar	Song used in the series Raghs Roye Shisheh
2019	Zendegi Edame Dare	Babak Sahraei	Babak Jahanbakhsh	Moein Rahbar	
2019	Az Khoshi Mimiram	Mehdi Ayoubi	Babak Jahanbakhsh	Hamed Baradaran	
2020	Hich	Mohsen Shirali	Babak Jahanbakhsh	Mixing and mastering Milad Farhoudi, piano Reza Tajbakhsh	
2020	Payane Taze	Mohsen Shirali	Babak Jahanbakhsh	Hooman Azma	
2020	Heyf	Amir Masoud Mirdamadi	Babak Jahanbakhsh	Moein Rahbar	
2020	Adamkosh	Mehdi Ayoubi	Babak Jahanbakhsh	Mohammad Reza Rahnama	
2021	Ba Man Bash				
2021	Nagam barat				
2021	Sazesh				
2022	Yadam nemire				
2022	To Mano Key Koshti				

== Composing for others ==
Babak Jahanbakhsh has passed the basics of composition and arrangement and theoretical music courses under the supervision of great music masters such as Morteza Delshad, Mojtaba Mirzadeh, Masoud Mirdamadi and others and has successfully completed them. Some of the songs that he has composed and arranged are:

Singer	Song name	Songwriter	Composer	Arrangement	Album
Ali Mokhtarpour	Etefagh	Mohsen Shirali	Babak Jahanbakhsh	Babak Jahanbakhsh	-
Kaveh Rafieian	Ama Nashod		Babak Jahanbakhsh	Babak Jahanbakhsh	Tahamol Nadaram
Mohammad Jafari	Azam Napors		Babak Jahanbakhsh	Babak Jahanbakhsh	Sargijeh
Mohammad Jafari	Ghabe Kohneh		Babak Jahanbakhsh	Babak Jahanbakhsh	Sargijeh
Saha	Del Sepordeh		Babak Jahanbakhsh	Babak Jahanbakhsh	-
Babak Zare	Nago Bargard	Somayeh Kaviani	Babak Jahanbakhsh	Pouria Heydari	-

== Concerts ==
Babak Jahanbakhsh has a history of attending the Fajr International Music Festival.

In the 5th Moghavemat Music Festival on 14 August 2013, Babak Jahanbakhsh performed with 4 other singers. The song "Jadeye Eshgh" was composed by Mohsen Shirali and was performed for the first time in this festival. Also, the songs "Mano Baroon" and "Darya", which were among the best works of Babak Jahanbakhsh, were performed in this festival.
