= Afshin (singer) =

Iranian singer (born 1978)

- Born: Afshin Jafari افشین جعفری; 6 May 1978 (age 48); Babol, Iran
- Genres: Pop; Dance
- Occupation: Singer
- Instrument: guitar
- Years active: 1999–present
- Labels: Taraneh Records; Avang Music; Caltex Records; Pars Video

Afshin Jafari (Persian: افشین جعفری), known by the mononym Afshin (Persian: افشین; born 6 May 1978), is an Iranian singer based in UAE.

Afshin moved with his family when he was seven. He started learning guitar at age 10 and started writing music and lyrics early on. In 1995, his family immigrated to Germany when he was 17 where they resided in Mannheim. Singing in Persian diaspora events and venues, at 21 he signed a contract with ParsVideo specializing in Iranian music. Afshin incorporated elements of Iranian music and youth-oriented western pop, hip hop and rap music in his songs and launched a number of albums and music videos that became popular in Germany and the Iranian diaspora. He is supported by Taraneh Records and Avang Music. His brother Amir Ali, a rapper, has contributed to some of his more recent releases.

== Discography ==
=== Albums ===
Year	Album title (transliteration)	Title in Persian language	Translation
1999	Booye Baroon	بوی بارون	"Scent of Rain"
2002	Setareh	ستاره	"Star"
2003	Aso Pas	آس و پاس	"Dire Strait"
2005	Maach	ماچ	"Kiss"
2008	Taraneh Baraye X	ترانه‌ای برای ایکس	"The Song for X"
2013	Gheire Ghanooni	غیرقانونی	"Illegal"
2017	Babam Migoft	بابام میگفت	"My Dad Said"

== Career ==
In 2013, Afshin started a music education institution in the United Arab Emirates (UAE) Founded with the vision of providing high-quality music education to the residents of the UAE. He now owns 23 branches of Melodica Music Academy in the UAE. He is the founder of Melodica Music Store in UAE
