= Abjeez =

Multilingual band founded in Sweden by Iranian-born sisters

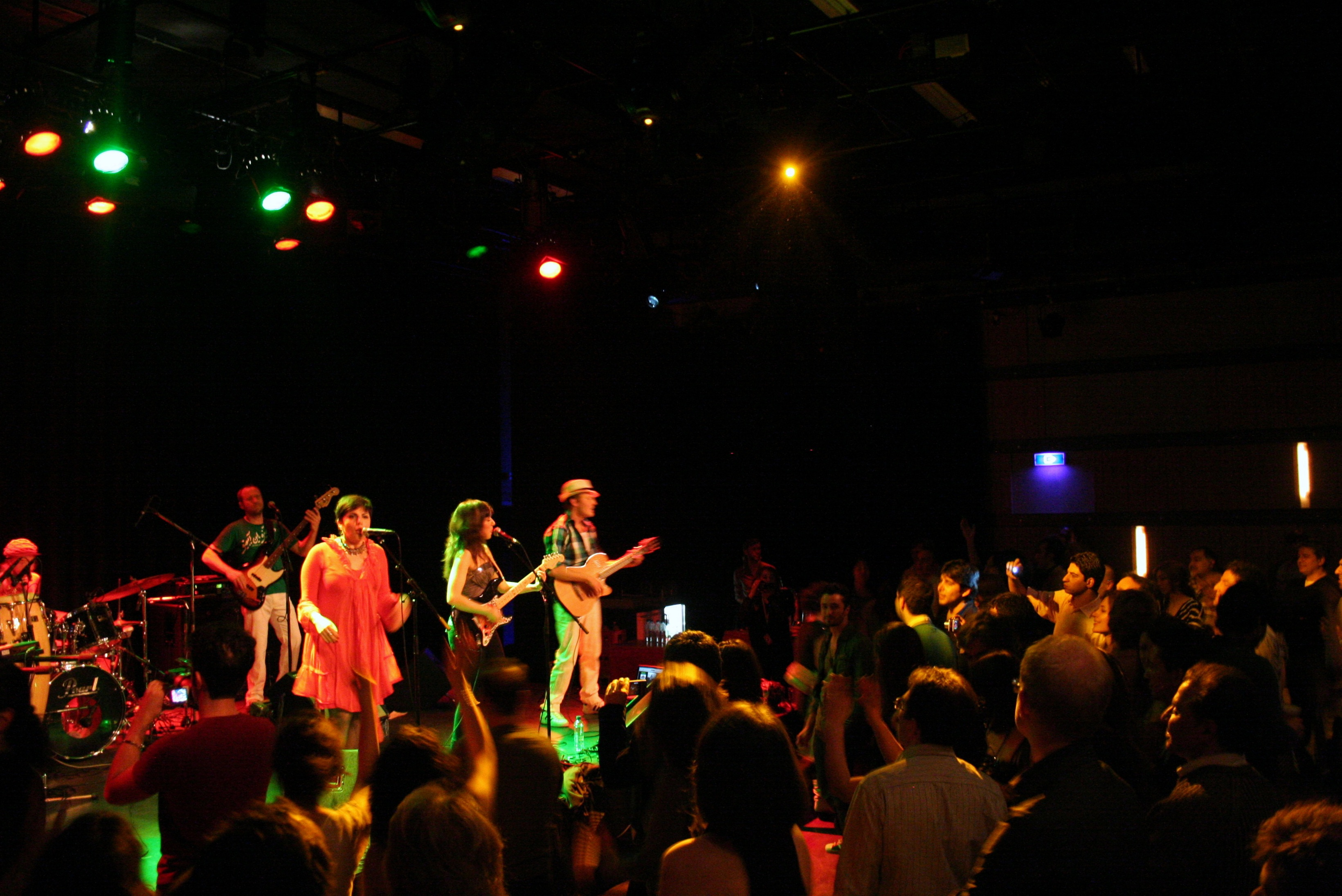
- Abjeez

Background information
- Origin: Sweden
- Genres: Reggae, Pop rock, Persian pop music, Ska, flamenco, soul
- Years active: 2005–present
- Label: CD Baby
- Members: Safoura Safavi; Melody Safavi
- Website: abjeez.com

Abjeez (Persian: آبجیز) is a multilingual Persian–Swedish fusion, world pop, alternative music band, founded in 2005 by Iranian-born sisters Melody Safavi and Safoura Safavi in Sweden.

== History ==
Abjeez (slang for "sisters" in Persian) was initially formed in Östersund, Sweden and expanded in Stockholm, Sweden with older sister, Melody, writing lyrics in Persian, and Safoura composing the music. In Stockholm, the Safavi sisters found backing musicians from Sweden, Norway, Scotland and Chile. Their lyrics often carry humorous and subversive cultural and political messages. Their genre of music has been described as a blend of Iranian soul rhythms with reggae, rock, ska, and flamenco. They sing mostly in their native Persian language, with a few exceptions in Swedish, Spanish, and English.

After a few years of touring in Europe, Canada, and the United States, the band went on hiatus as Safoura pursued her studies in performance art and sound design at Stockholm University of the Arts. Abjeez released their third album "Paa Sho" (Stand Up) in 2017. It was recorded in Costa Rica and Stockholm in 2016.

== Critical acclaim ==
Critics have described Abjeez as the first female-led Persian-speaking Reggae/Ska band and pioneers for singing about taboo subjects in Persian language, Iranian culture, and even American foreign policy and the war on terror. Abjeez were subjects of a 2009 documentary film titled "Systrar (Sisters)" by Swedish film-maker Henrik Perälä.

The most consistent subject matters voiced in Abjeez music are issues related to gender, women's rights and youth in Iran.

Their debut music video Eddeaa (meaning "Pretension" in English) was nominated in the short film category at Tribeca Film Festival in New York City in 2007. It was also selected as the best music video of the year at Link TV's world music channel in 2007. The band has performed in various music and film festivals such as the Rotterdam Film Festival in the Netherlands.

Abjeez have been described by various commentators as one of the most successful Iranian music groups of the 2000s, performing at sold-out concerts across Europe and North America, including at the legendary Roxy Theater in Los Angeles, California in December 2010.

== Band members ==
=== 2014 – present ===
Member	Role
Safoura Safavi	Composer, lead singer and guitar
Melody Safavi	Songwriter, back and harmony vocals

=== 2005 – 2014 ===
Member	Role
Erland Hofgaard	Bass
Robin Cochrane	Drums
Johan Moberg	Guitar
Sufi Safavi	Sound engineer/mixer (live/recording), production/tour management, copyright and contract law issues
Paulo Murga	Percussion
Nicolas Lazo Zubieta	Percussion / saxophone

== Discography ==
- Hameh (2007)
- Who's Yo Daddy (2007)
- Perfectly Displaced (2009)
- Paa Sho! (2017)
