= Chaartaar =

Iranian musical band

Chaartaar ensemble
- Cover of Baaraan Toie, released in 2014

Background information
- Origin: Iran
- Genres: Persian fusion music
- Years active: 2011–present
- Members: Arman Garshasbi (singer); Arash Fathi (composer); Ehsan Haeri (poet); Aeen Ahmadifar (arrangement)

Chaartaar (Persian: چارتار lit. Four Strings) is a Persian fusion band founded in 2011.

== Members ==
- Arman Garshasbi, vocalist
- Arash Fathi - Composer
- Ehsan Haeri - songwriter
- Aeen Ahmadifar - Arrangement

== Style ==
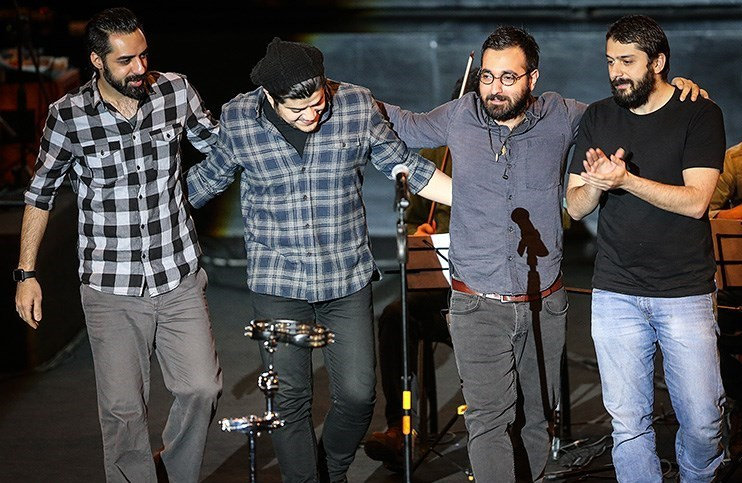
Chaartaar concert for Nowruz at Milad Tower, Tehran, 2015

The group’s style is a fusion of electronic music combined with Persian vocal music.

In September and October 2016 "Chaartaar" had their first live tour out of Iran, they started their tour from Vancouver in Canada and continued it in Calgary, Montreal and Toronto. After that they traveled to Europe and continue their tour in Rotterdam, Düsseldorf, London, Manchester, Gothenburg, Stockholm and Frankfurt.

== Albums ==
Albums	Baaraan Toee (You are the Rain) (Official, Released: 2014)			
No.	Title	Native	English Translation	Length
01	Ashoobam	آشوبم	I am Unrest	4:52
02	Maraa Be Khaaterat Negah Daar	مرا به خاطرت نگه‌دار	Keep me in your memory	3:26
03	Hendeseh	هندسه	Geometry	4:11
04	Baaraan Toee	باران تویی	You are the Rain (rain is you)	3:52
05	Zane Divaaneh	زن دیوانه	Madwoman	3:50
06	Kalaagh	کلاغ	The Crow	3:42
07	Asheghaaneh Tanhaast	عاشقانه تنهاست	Amorously in lonely	3:50
08	Harfi Bezan	حرفی بزن	Say Something	3:43
09	Khosha Be Man	خوشا به من	Slorias Me	3:06
10	Shabihe Yek Mordaab	شبیه یک مرداب	Like a Lagoon	3:48
11	Dar Hasrate Maah	در حسرت ماه	In longing of the Moon	4:00
12	Ghataar (Chaartaar)	قطار (چارتار)	The Train (Chaartaar)	4:02
Jaddeh Miraghsad (The Road's dancing) (Official, Released: 2015)
No.	Title	Native	English Translation	Length
01	Leylache	لیلاچه	The little Leyla	3:27
02	Aseman Ham Zamin Khorad	آسمان هم زمین می‌خورد	Even the Sky Falls to Ground	3:52
03	Babr	ببر	The Tiger	3:45
04	Jadde Miraghsad	جاده می‌رقصد	The Road's dancing	3:26
05	Hozori Etefaghi	حضوری اتفاقی	The Accident Presence	4:32
06	Hich Dar Hich	هیچ در هیچ	Nothing but Nothingness	3:31
07	Man Dahanam	من دهانم	Me, the very Mouth	3:41
08	Ghazal Nashod	غزل نشد	The Unrealized Poetry	2:34
09	Dariche	دریچه	The Hatch	3:35
Darya Kojast? (Where is the Sea?) (Official, Released: 2018)
No.	Title	Native	English Translation	Length
01	Aghoosh	آغوش	Embrace	3:18
02	Door	دور	Far Away	4:35
03	Hejrat	هجرت	Emigration	3:55
04	Darya Kojast?	دریا کجاست؟	Where is the Sea?	4:23
05	Bargard	برگرد	Come Back	4:00
06	Benevis	بنویس	Write It	3:32
07	Ghoroob	غروب	Sunset	4:35
08	Tardid Raftan	تردید رفتن	Hesitate to Leave	3:11
09	Chashm Bi Barabar	چشم بی برابر	Unequal Eyes	3:44
10	Khalgh	خلق	The People	3:36

== Awards ==
- Best Album of year (in fusion style): Baaraan Toee
- Best Track of year (in fusion style): Baaraan Toee
- Best-selling Album in beeptunes: Jaddeh Miraghsad
- Barbad award for best pop music composition: Baaraan Toee
