= Alireza Talischi =

Iranian singer

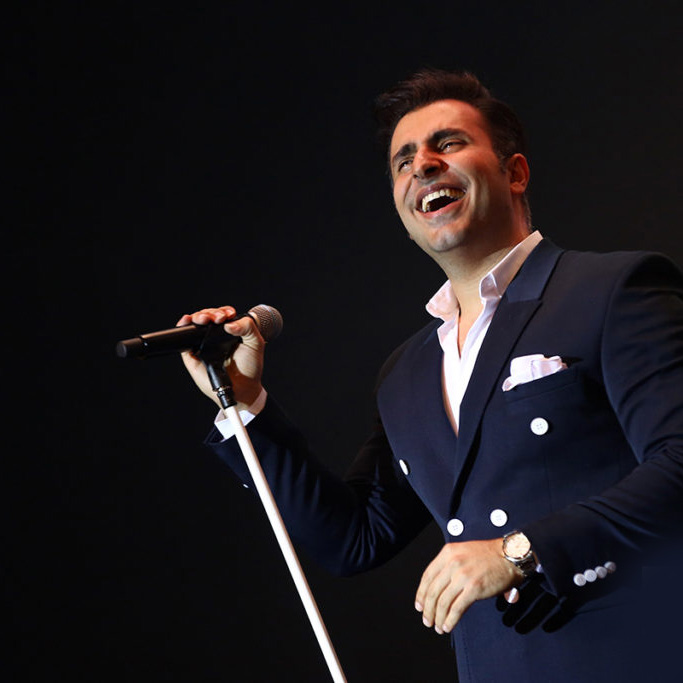
- Talischi at the Fajr International Music Festival
- Born: September 29, 1985 (age 40); Tehran, Iran
- Occupations: Singer; songwriter; composer; arrangement
- Musical career
- Genres: Persian Pop
- Instruments: Vocals; guitar; piano
- Years active: 2006–present
- Website: alirezatalischi.com

Alireza Talischi (Persian: علیرضا طلیسچی; born September 29, 1985, in Tehran) is an Iranian singer, songwriter and music producer.

== Career ==
Alireza Talischi started singing professionally when he was 18 years old. In February 2005, he and one of his friends named Hamidreza started his official activity as a two-person group called "Alireza and Hamidreza". At that time, they released songs that were well received by the people at that time. Together, the two released two albums called "Narefigh 1" and "Narefigh 2". After a while, Alireza decided to continue his musical activities individually. He released his first official album called "Daghigheham" in 2016. His first concert was held on December 5, 2016, in Milad Hall of Tehran International Fair.

== Discography ==
=== Informal ===
- Narefigh 1 (2005)
- Narefigh 2 (2007)
- Bi Marefat (2006)
- Ghomar (2008)
- Bi Vafa (2007)
- Shirino Farhad (2005)
- Bi Hoviat (2006)

=== Official ===
- Daghigheham (2016)

=== Singles ===
- 2009: Chaharshanbe Suri
- 2009: Nato (Ft Hamidreza & Ali As'habi) (the Sly)
- 2010: Ba Man Bemoon (Ft Babak Mafi) (Stay with me)
- 2010: 'Emshab' ' (Tonight)
- 2010: Halgheh (The Ring)
- 2011: 1%
- 2011: Gharar Nabood (Wasn't supposed)
- 2011: Taghvim (Calendar)
- 2011: Ruze Nohom (The ninth day)
- 2012: Cheghadr Dir (Ft Siavash Kasikhani) (Too late)
- 2012: Age Bedooni (You know)
- 2012: Vabastegi (Dependency)
- 2013: Hame Donyam Toei (You are my whole world)
- 2013: Sahel (Beach)
- 2013: Dooset Daram (I love you)
- 2013: Ruberuye Man (In front of me)
- 2014: To Kenare Oon Khoshi (You're happy with him)
- 2014: In Zemestoonam Tamoom Shod (This winter also was over)
- 2014: Nabashi Pisham (Don't be with me)
- 2014: Moohat (Your hair)
- 2014: Nemikhamet (I don't want you)
- 2015: 175
- 2015: Daghigheham (My minutes)
- 2015: Yalda
- 2016: Siaah (the Black)
- 2016: Zakhmaye Man (My wounds)
- 2016: Azizi (You're dear)
- 2016: Delam Pishe Toe (My heart is with you)
- 2016: Delgiram (I'm upset)
- 2016: Rad Dade Boodi (You refused)
- 2016: Be Khodam Bad Kardam (Ft Saeed Atani) (I hurt myself)
- 2017: Begoo Na (Say no)
- 2017: Ahange Ghamgin (the Sad song)
- 2017: Man Hamoonam (I'm the same)
- 2017: Nafase Ki Budi To (Whose breath were you?)
- 2017: Deli (From the heart)
- 2017: Ay Dele Khodam (Oh my heart)
- 2017: To Fekr Mikoni Kiee? (Who do you think you are?)
- 2018: Miram Peye Kaaram (I'm going to my work)
- 2018: Ey Dade Bar Man (Oh shout at me)
- 2018: Divooneye Doost Dashtani (Lovely crazy)
- 2018: Akharesh Ghashange (The end is beautiful)
- 2019: Zendegi Joonam (My life)
- 2019: Sakhtgir (Strict)
- 2019: Bam Nabood Kasi (No one was with me)
- 2020: Madar (Mother)
- 2020: Ay Dele Ghafel (Oh careless heart)
- 2021: Del Be Del (Heart to Heart)
- 2021: Ghaf (Gh-Persian Alphabet)
- 2021: Medly 1 (Remix)
- 2022: Khatereh (Memory)
- 2022: Leyla
- 2022: Na Nemiaram (No, I won't)
- 2022: Ye Darya Narim (Let's go to sea)
- 2023: Paghadam
- 2024: Havar Havar

== See also ==
- Iranian pop music
