= Sahar Ajdamsani =

Iranian singer and photographer (born 1996)

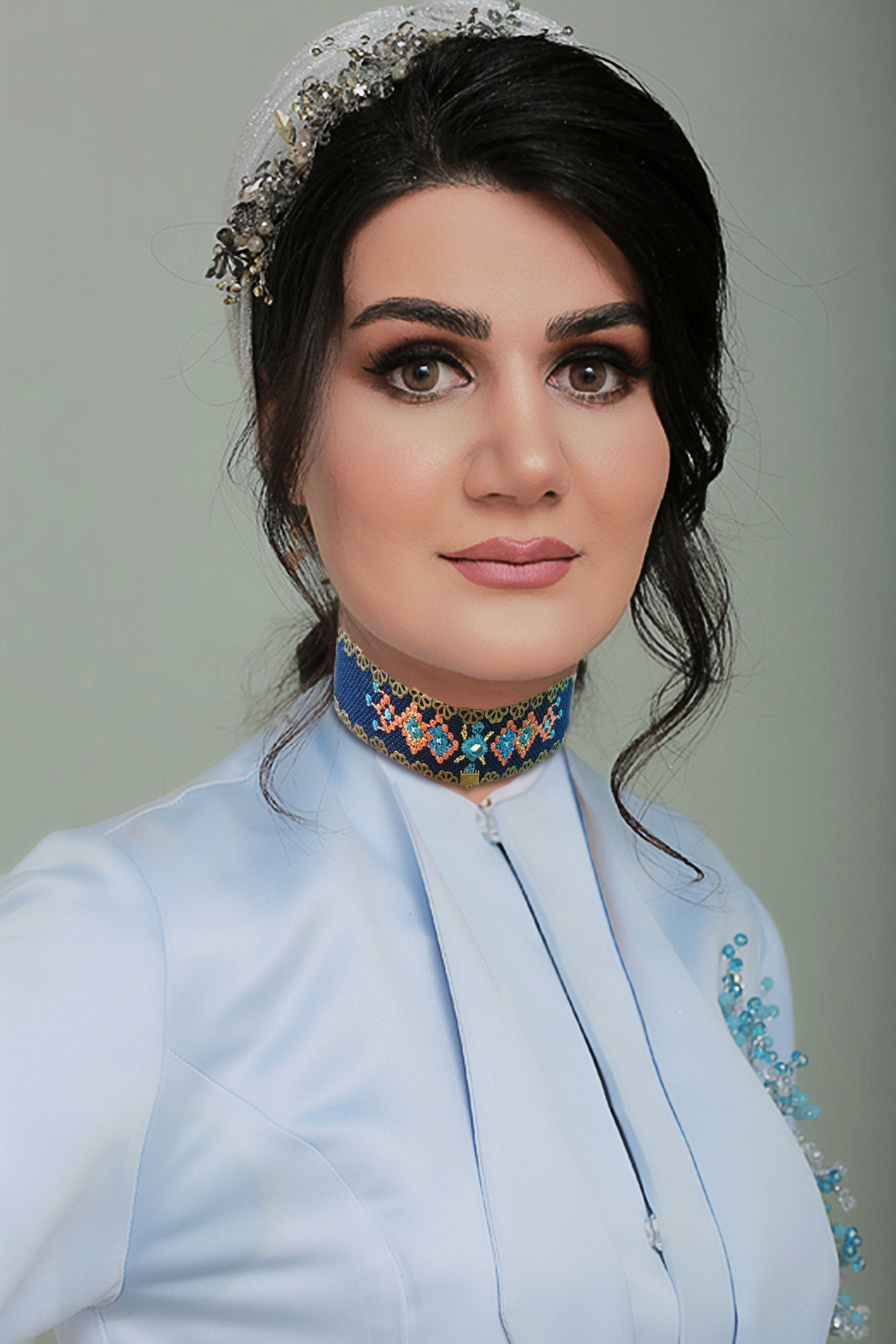

Background information
- Born: 26 March 1996 (age 30); Tehran, Iran
- Origin: Iran
- Occupations: Singer, songwriter, poet, lyricist, writer, photographer

Sahar Ajdamsani (Persian:سحر اژدم ثانی; born 26 March 1996) is an Iranian singer, songwriter, poet, lyricist, writer, and photographer.

== Biography ==
Sahar started writing poetry at the age of eight, and has written poetry in Persian, English and German.‍

The theme of her works are world peace, the defense of women's rights, kindness, and humanity. She is known as an artist who defends women's rights and human rights with her arts and promotes peace, humanity, equality & kindness.

She is one of the few Iranian artists that many countries have written about her arts and is the first Iranian who is the winner of WILD sound poetry festival for her poem "Censorship" that focuses on women's rights.

Sahar also selected as the representative of the Global Photographic Union in Iran.

Although music in Iran is forbidden and prohibited for women, she has had many concerts in many countries and despite the many limitations for women in Iran, she has succeeded and is internationally recognized.

Her poems have been translated into many languages and published in many countries. She has also been invited to poetry festivals in many countries.

== Awards ==
- WILDsound poetry festival, New York, US, 2019
- Black & White photography festival, Athens, Greece, 2019
- Best poet of 8th International Athens poetry festival, Athens, Greece, 2019
- 10th Woman Scream international poetry festival, Mexico, 2020

== Books ==
- 5th season of the earth, a 2018 (poetry book)
- I flew to the moon, a 2019 (poetry book)

== Albums ==
- Dreamy World: A world peace music album. The melody of every poem in this album is composed by a composer of a country, with 13 countries collaborating in this album. The purpose of this UN and UNICEF supported album was to demonstrate the world seeking peace.

== Unique Art works ==
- Quarantine World: A song and music video about the COVID-19 pandemic in 11 different languages (Persian, English, German, Kurdish, French, Arabic, Italian, Spanish, Russian, Hindi, and Greek) featured 11 world stars (Jessica Lynn, Bernd Kieckhäben, Karwan Kamil, Flora Fishbach, Ammar Alazaki, Erica De Matteis, Luis Fernando Borjas, Rodion Gazmanov, Jyotica Tangri, Nasos Papargyropoulos). Sahar wrote the lyrics (all languages) and melody herself. She wrote the lyrics in one day and mentioned it as a miracle. She is also producer, director and screenwriter of this global project.

== Exhibitions ==
- Athens, Greece, 2019
- Milan, Italy, 2020
