= Ali Lohrasbi =

Iranian singer (born 1976)

- علی لهراسبی
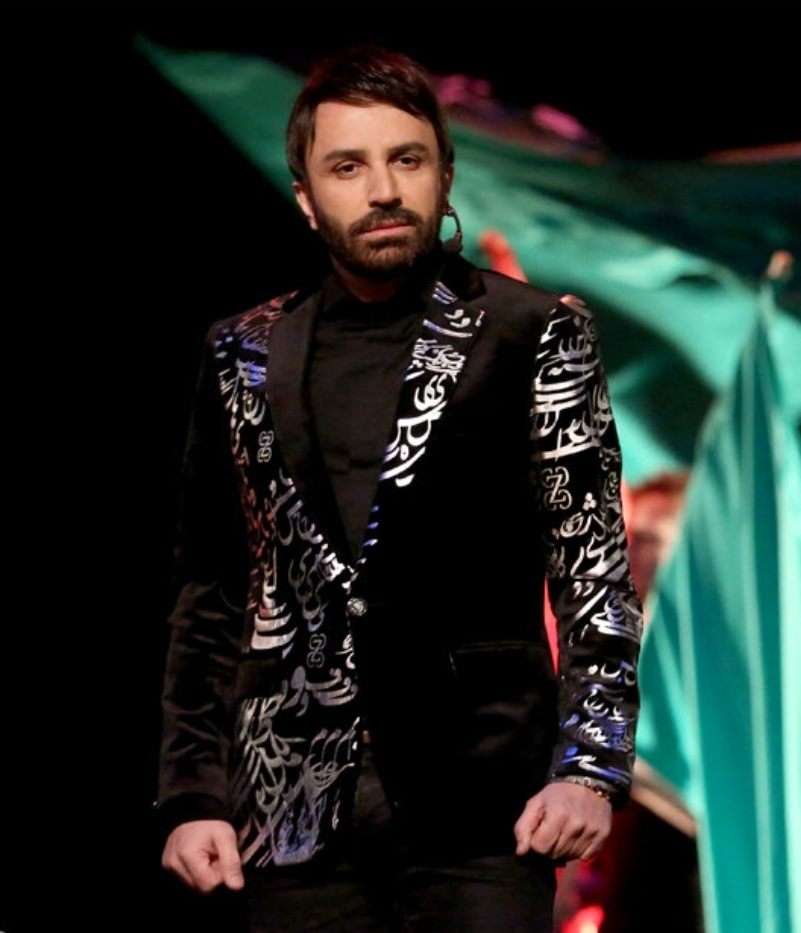
- Lohrasbi (2019)
- Born: 9 April 1976 (age 50); Tehran, Iran
- Occupation: Singer
- Musical career
- Genres: Persian Pop
- Instruments: Vocals; Piano
- Years active: 2005–present

Ali Lohrasbi (Persian: علی لهراسبی; born 9 April 1976, in Tehran) is an Iranian singer and pop-star.

== Early life ==
Ali Lohrasbi is from Tehran. He was born on April 9, 1976. He is the first child in his family and has 3 younger brothers. He was a Quran reader in his childhood. Correct reading of Quran helped him to learn many tremolos. He studied electronics at Islamic Azad University, Karaj Branch. After he was accepted to university, he began to learn piano. Lohrasbi started writing songs for children.

== Career ==
Performing the theme song of White Cottage series was his first official activity in pop music.

After 2 years, he released his first album published Daryaeeha. Lohrasbi's next album Mosalas was released in 2006. One of its songs is "Biraheha". He performed many concerts, mostly in Kish and Tehran. His concert at Saadabad palace was held on September 9 and 10, 2007 with audiences of more than 5000 each night. His other albums were 14, Tasmim and Robot. Some of the big songs of these albums are "Kooh", "Delnavazan", "Harfaye Nagofte", "Ghalbam", "Shor Shore Baroon" and "Delhore".

== Discography ==
- From sea (2003) (دریایی ها)
- Triangle (2006) (مثلّث)
- 14 (2009) (۱۴)
- Decision (2011) (تصمیم)
- Robot (2014) (ربات)
