= Iraj Rahmanpour =

Iranian singer (born 1957)

Iraj Rahmanpour ایرج رحمانپور

Background information
- Born: 1957 (age 68–69); Khoramabad, Luristan, Iran
- Origin: Luristan, Iran
- Occupations: folk singer, songwriter

Iraj Rahmanpour (Persian: ایرج رحمانپور) born in 1957, is an Iranian Lur singer, songwriter, and writer. His opera includes written and musical works about the culture and art of the Zagros region and the music of Luri and Laki people.

== Musical career ==
His music career began in 1977 and numerous concerts have been held in Iran and other countries. The goal of his activities is the development of native culture. His style in singing is unique. He researches about lost and obsolete songs, and forgotten ancient languages of Iran, and runs them revived through his songs. His style is called “Hur” and “Moaning” in native language, which is part of tradition and customes dating back to ancient centuries in Iran. His songs are performed in different Iranian languages such as Laki, Lori and Persian.

== Poems (songs) ==
His poems in the languages he usually performs in, such as Persian, Laki, Luri, describe:

- Nature of the Zagros Mountains
- Myths, legends and beliefs of the nomadic tribes of the area.
- Social problems like addiction, poverty and human disasters (earthquakes, chemical bombardment of Halabja etc). His unique singing style is delivered in the traditional styles called “Hur” and “Moaning” .
- 'I Write You'
- 'Rara'
- 'My Land'
- 'You Are Green'
- 'Your Secret'
- 'Moaning'
- 'Broken Column'
- 'Mirror of Tears'
- 'Spring Breeze'
