= Faramarz Assef =

Faramarz Assef فرامرز آصف
- Born: Faramarz Assef Nakhaei; 27 October 1950 (age 76); Abadan, Iran
- Genre: Iranian pop
- Occupations: Singer; songwriter; architect; athlete
- Years active: 1977–present
- Label: Afra Production Co.
- Website: assefmusic.com
- Sports career
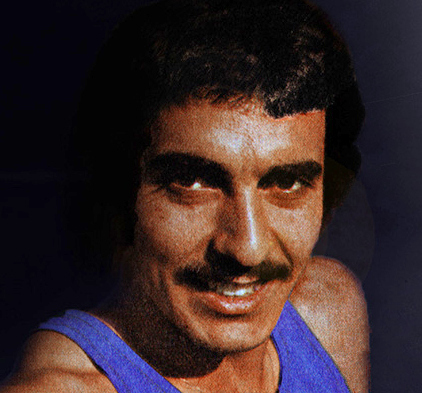
- Assef as an athlete in 1970s
- Education: University of Southern California
- Sport: Athletics
- Event: Triple jump
Medal record
Representing (Iran)
Asian Games
Bronze medal – third place	1974 Tehran	Triple jump

Faramarz Assef (Persian: فرامرز آصف; born 27 October 1950 in Abadan, Iran) is an Iranian music artist and former long and triple jumper who won a bronze medal at the 1974 Asian Games in Tehran in triple jump.

== Music career ==
As a graduate in architecture from University of Southern California (USC), Assef began his music career in Los Angeles, California in 1984. Since then, he has produced eight albums titled AFRA 1-8 along with four single songs. His most famous song, "Haji", brought him to the attention of Iranian communities around the world. Due to his sport background, Faramarz Assef is referred to as a bird with iron wings in Iranian pop music. He married Yalda in 2003 and has two children, his daughter Ranaa and his son Ramin.
