= Ali Abdolmaleki =

Iranian pop singer

Ali Abdolmaleki علی عبدالمالکی
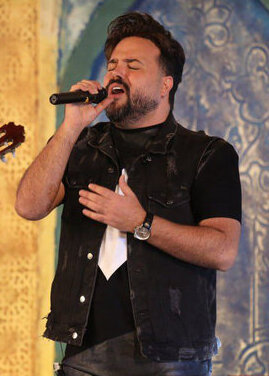
- Abdolmaleki in April 2023

Background information
- Born: 17 August 1988 (age 38); Tehran, Iran
- Genres: Iranian Pop
- Occupations: Singer; Songwriter; Composer; Arranger
- Instruments: Vocals; Guitar; Piano; Keyboard
- Years active: 2007–present

Ali Abdolmaleki (Persian: علی عبدالمالکی; born 17 August 1988 in Tehran) is an Iranian pop singer, songwriter, composer and arranger. He made several hit songs at a young age. He contributes as one of the leading Iranian pop music composers.

== Albums ==
=== Studio albums ===
| Title | Album details |
Persian-language
| مخاطب خاص | Released: 25 May 2015; Label: Art World Company; Format: CD, digital download |

=== Extended albums ===
| Title | Album details |
Persian-language
| خدا نشناس | Released: January 2008; Label: Himself; Format: digital download |
| نامسلمون | Released: April 2009; Label: Himself; Format: digital download |
