= Siavash Shams =

Iranian singer (born 1963)

Siavash Shams سیاوش شمس قهفرخی
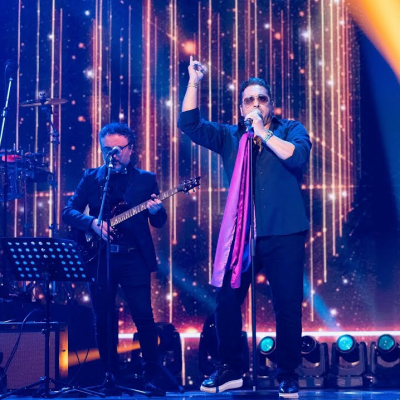

Background information
- Born: 26 January 1963 (age 63); Ahvaz, Iran
- Genres: World, Pop, dance, Persian, Traditional pop
- Occupations: Singer, songwriter, record producer
- Years active: 1985–present
- Labels: The world music records
- Website: www.siavash.com

Siavash Shams (Persian: سیاوش شمس) (also known as Siavash Sahneh (Persian: سیاوش صحنه) due to his hit song Sahneh) (born 17 January 1963) is an Iranian singer, songwriter, record producer. He rose to fame in the late 80s after his songs Sahneh ("Stage") and Dokhtar Irooni ("Iranian Girl") became successful hits. He continued with albums Pedar ("Father") and Faryad (Scream) . His songs "Yavash Yavash", "Dooset Nadaram", "Chikeh Chikeh", "Beraghs", "Dokhtar Choopoon", "Havar Havar", "Male Mani", "Nagoo Kieh", and "Sahneh" were the biggest hits.

== Early life ==
Siavash was born in Ahvas, Iran. Siavash spent his early childhood in the Amaniyeh neighborhood of Ahvaz until age five, when his family moved to Tehran, where he completed primary school. At age 13, he emigrated to the United States with his older brother Siamak and settled in San Diego. He attended middle and high school in the U.S. before enrolling at the University of California, studying music and computer science.

== Career ==
Siavash launched his professional music career in 1985 with the debut album Hamsayeha (Neighbors), produced by Farrokh Ahi and in collaboration with childhood friend Alireza Amirghassemi. The album reportedly sold over 500,000 copies, making it one of the best-selling albums among Iranians in exile.

In 1992, he released Sahneh (Stage), the album that earned him his nickname “Siavash Sahneh”. He wrote most of the songs himself. Signature tracks include “Sahneh”, “Chikeh Chikeh”, and “Yavash Yavash” SoundCloud. Following that, his albums Pedar (Father, 1995), Didar (1996), and Faryad (Scream, 1997) gained considerable regional and diaspora popularity.

He continued with further albums including The Voice (2001) and Seven (2009). In the early 2010s and beyond, Siavash released singles such as “Mohtaj”, “Dorough”, “Yek Do Se”, “Gole Man”, and “Delbare Naz” among others.

After a gap following his single "Dorough", Siavash recorded an upbeat dance song "Mohtaj", in collaboration with songwriter and producer Shahram Kabiri. The song quickly received more than 1.5 million downloads and views and became one of Siavash's most popular songs. He wrote the melody, with lyrics by Kabiri, songwriter and producer. The video was directed by Ramin Kabiri.

== Discography ==
=== Albums ===
- Hamsayeha (1985)
- Sahneh (1993)
- Poudmayday Per (1994)
- Pedar (1995)
- Didar (1996) (lyrics by Shahram Kabiri)
- Faryad (1997)
- Fahrten Maymouth (1998)
- The Voice (2001)
- Seven (2009)

=== Singles ===
- Gole Man (2010)
- Dorough (2011)
- Nemidoonam (2012)
- Aieet Duuduu (2012)
- Mohtaj (2012) (lyrics by Shahram Kabiri)
- Delbare naz (2012)
- Yek Do Se (2012)
- Nafas (2012)
- Hesse man (2013)
- Khoshhalam (2013) (arrangement by Afshin Khaje Nezhad)
- Gerye (2015)
- Oghyanous (2017)
- Ashegham Kardi (2019)
- Ghahveye Ghajar (2021)
