= Shahrokh (singer) =

Iranian singer and songwriter (1949–2023)

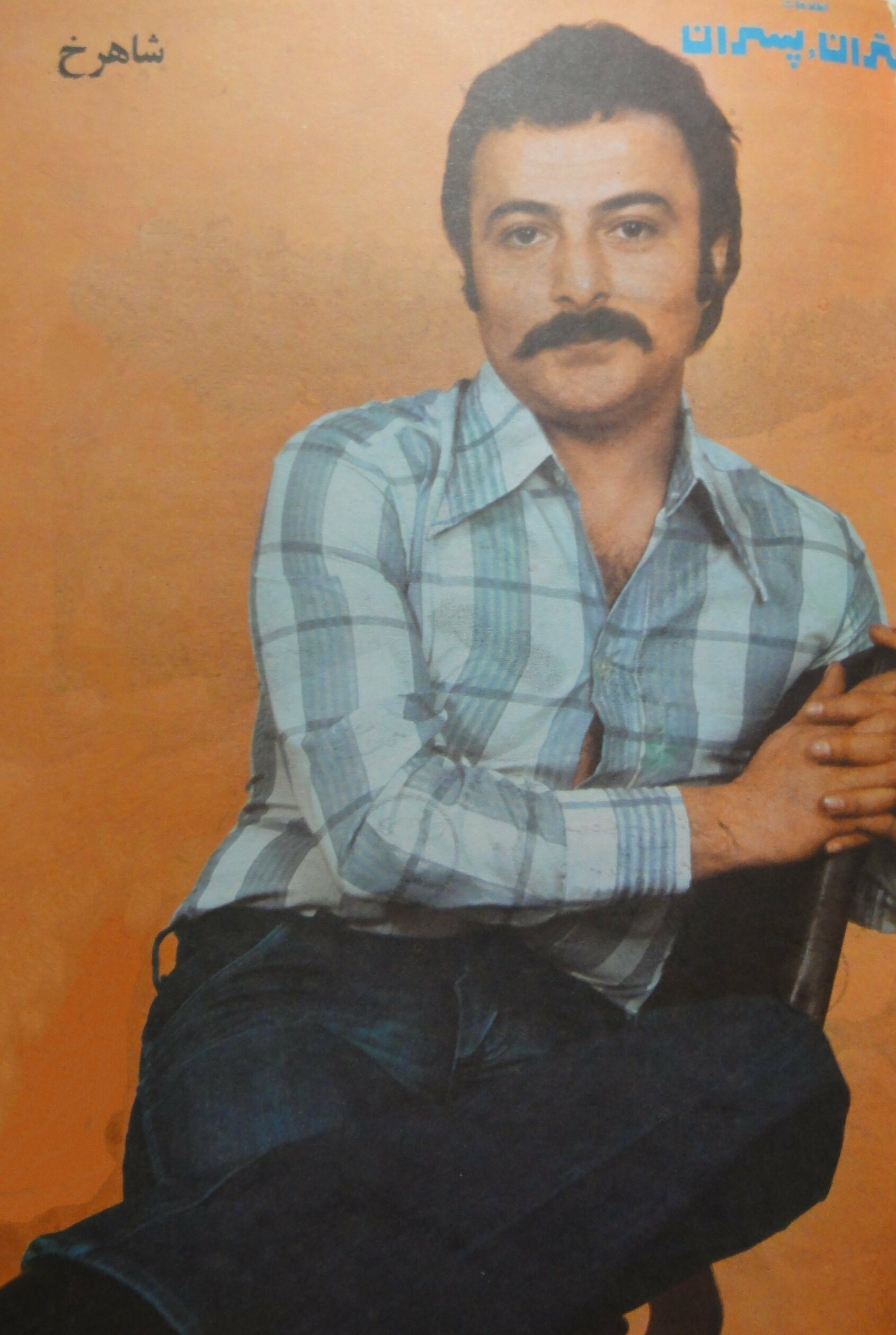

Background information
- Born: Morteza Shahid; November 27, 1949; Tehran, Imperial State of Iran
- Died: December 3, 2023 (aged 74) Los Angeles, California, US
- Genres: Persian classical; folk; persian pop
- Occupations: Singer, songwriter, composer
- Years active: 1963–2023
- Labels: Avang Music; Caltex Records; Taraneh Enterprises Inc; Pars Video; Melody Studio
- Website: www.shahrokhmusic.com

Morteza Shahid (Persian: مرتضی شاهید; November 27, 1949 – December 3, 2023), known by his stage name Shahrokh (شاهرخ), was an Iranian singer, songwriter and composer of Persian Classical and pop music. Shahrokh died of cancer on December 3, 2023, at the age of 74.

== Professional life ==
=== Beginnings ===
Shahrokh Shahid began his artistic career at the age of 13 on the children's program of Radio Iran, and in those same years, encouraged by his father to learn Iranian musical radifs, he attended Esmail Mehrtash's classes in the Barbod community for 10 years. He also learned notes and solfege for 5 years at the National Music Conservatory under the supervision of Mostafa Kamal Pourtorab, and thus, in addition to mastering traditional musical instruments, he became familiar with the basics and steps of Western and classical music. During these years, Shahrokh collaborated with the National Choir Orchestra of Iran led by Alfred Malroyan as a soloist and performed various programs at the Rudaki Hall. In 1974, Shahrokh performed his first song, "Dooset Daram", with lyrics by Shahram Vafaei and music composed by Amir Aram, at the age of 25, which was applauded and supported by the public. Among his later songs are "Shaba Bee Tou" and "Rah Bioft". In the fall of 1975, Shahrokh performed a song of the same name in the TV series Gharibeh, which was broadcast every night on Iranian national television for two years. The broadcast of this song in this series played a major role in Shahrokh's fame. At the beginning of his career, Shahrokh collaborated with prominent and notable composers such as Hossein Vaseghi, Manouchehr Taherzadeh, Mohammad Shams, Davoud Ardalan, Mansour Irannejad, Sadegh Nojouki, and Nasser Cheshmazar. Shahram Vafaei, Saeed Dabiri, Farhang Ghasemi, Masoud Houshmand, and Fathollah Manouchehri were also among the songwriters who collaborated with Shahrokh before the revolution.

=== Fame and immigration ===
Shahrokh Shahid released two albums by 1976. In November 1977, he immigrated to the United States to continue his music studies and work with the Los Angeles Philharmonic Orchestra, becoming the second singer to live in Los Angeles after Viguen Derderian. Shahrokh returned to Iran four months before the 1979 Iranian Revolution to be with his family. He moved back to the United States the night before Ruhollah Khomeini arrived in Iran.

=== After the Revolution and America ===
After immigrating to America, Shahrokh Shahid released his first albums, "Nowhere in Iran" and "Goodbye Tehran," in 1980 and 1982, respectively, which he co-wrote with Ebi and Shahram Shabpareh. In the early 1990s, he also co-wrote the album "Shahgol," co-written with Ebi and Shahram Solati. Shahrokh, while composing most of his own music, also collaborated with prominent composers such as Farid Zoland, Siavash Ghomayshi, Manouchehr Cheshmazar, Andranik, Kazem Alemi, Bijan Mortazavi, Elton Farokh Ahi, and Schubert Avakian. In addition to continuing to collaborate with his longtime collaborator Shahram Vafaei, he collaborated with prominent songwriters such as Masoud Amini, Homa Mirafshar, Ardalan Sarfaraz, Shahyar Ghanbari, Masoud Fardmanesh, Iraj Razmjoo, Paksima Zakipour, and Yaghma Golrouee during his exile. Most of the songs that made him famous in the post-revolutionary era were on his solo albums.

One of Shahrokh's most famous songs was "Marghoob", which was released in 2002 with Masoud Amini's lyrics, his own composition, and Schubert Avakian's arrangement on the album "Areezeh".

== Political action ==
Shahrukh's interview with Behnood Mokri from Voice of America

Most of Shahrokh's albums have political themes opposing the Islamic Republic. Shahrokh believed that "no exiled Iranian can say that he is not political."

In 2021, Shahrokh Shahid, along with other Iranian singers, actors, and other artists opposed to the Islamic Republic, signed a pact for national solidarity for democracy in Iran. They called for the resignation of the Leader of the Islamic Republic, the dissolution of the constitution, and the formation of a new political system in Iran.

With the beginning of the 2022 Iranian uprising, while being treated for cancer, he tried to continue the fight against the Islamic Republic and published messages. In one of these messages, he praised the Iranian youth and called on the rest of the Iranian people to take to the streets and support them.

== Discography ==
=== Studio albums ===
- Ghoroob, 1975 Taraneh Records
- Koli, 1976 Taraneh Records
- Vahdat (feat. Ebi, Farhad Mehrad, ...), 1978 Taraneh Records
- Heech Koja Iran Nemisheh (feat. Ebi and Shahram Shabpareh), 1980 Caltex Records
- Khodahafez Tehran (feat. Ebi and Shahram Shabpareh), 1982 Caltex Records
- Man-o-Tou, 1983 Taraneh Records
- Aroosi, 1985 Caltex Records
- Oushagh 2 (Memorial of Aref Qazvini), 1986 Pars Video
- Atigheh, 1987 Taraneh Records
- Maahe Shabe Chahardah, 1988 Pars Video
- Aroosake Shekastani, 1990 Caltex Records
- Shahgol (feat. Ebi and Shahram Solati), 1992 Caltex Records
- Ahoo, 1994 Avang Music
- Lobat, 1996 Pars Video
- Hekayat 4 (feat. Masoud Fardmanesh), 1997 Taraneh Records
- Kakoli, 1998 Avang Music
- Khooneh, 2000 Avang Music
- Areezeh, 2002 Chehrehnama
- Taraneh Baran, 2007 Melody Studio

=== Singles ===
- Dooset Daram (First Version), 1975
- Gharibeh (First Version), 1975
- Yatim (Gharib), 1975
- Chi Mishod, 1976
- Paeez (First Version), 1976
- Boghz, 1976
- Koocheye Miaad (Hegh Heghe Geryeh), 1977
- Khoobe Man (Ghasedak), 1978
- Khake Khoobe Man (feat. Aref, Sattar, Morteza, Houshmand Aghili, ...), 1985
- Ey Nasime Noubahari (feat. Dariush, Sattar, Morteza, Andy, Kouros, ...), 1986
- Direh Direh, 1986
- Iran Aroosi Kardeh, 1986
- Shahre Barfi, 1993
- Didar Dar Damavand (feat. Sattar, Mahasti, Shohreh, Morteza, Andy and Hatef), 2001
- Ali, 2001
- Daneshjoo, 2002
- Ray Nemidaham, 2005
- Kabootar (Demo Version), 2006
- Kare Del (Demo Version), 2008
- Ahriman, 2008
- Mahde Kohan, 2010
- Shahzadeye Royaye Man, 2010
- Nemisheh, 2011
- Rosvaye Zamaneh, 2011
- Zibaye Khofteh, 2012
- Kare Del, 2013
- Shoma, 2013
- Ghessehaye Man, 2013
- Aghoosh, 2014
- Ziba, 2014
- Kee Gofteh, 2014
- Haz Kardam, 2014
- Khiyal Nakon (New Version), 2014
- Dele Maa Bin (New Version), 2014
- Donyaye Bi Ghanoon, 2014
- Deldadeh, 2014
- Delshoureh, 2015
- Gharib (New Version), 2015
- Chatr, 2015
- Andooh, 2016
- Khabam Nemibareh, 2016
- Khoshhal, 2016
- Aramesh, 2016
- Ashegh, 2017
- Bekhay Nakhay, 2017
- Hamzad, 2017
- Zayandehroud, 2017
- Dine Behin, 2018
- Zahhak, 2018
- Khazar, 2018
- Alaki, 2018
- Bozak, 2018
- Hamshahri, 2019
- Bidadgah, 2019
- Khaterehsazi, 2019
- Razmavaran, 2019
- Chemeh, 2020
- Nafas Mikesham, 2020
- Golvajeh, 2020
- Hasrat, 2020
- Vatan, 2020
- Nakhoda, 2020
- Talangor, 2021
- Amamehdar, 2022
- Yade Tou, 2023
- Golab, 2024
- Yadvareh, 2024
- Atal Matal, 2025
- Kabootar (Complete Version), 2025
- Eshghe Efrati, 2026
