= Maryam Heydarzadeh =

Iranian musician

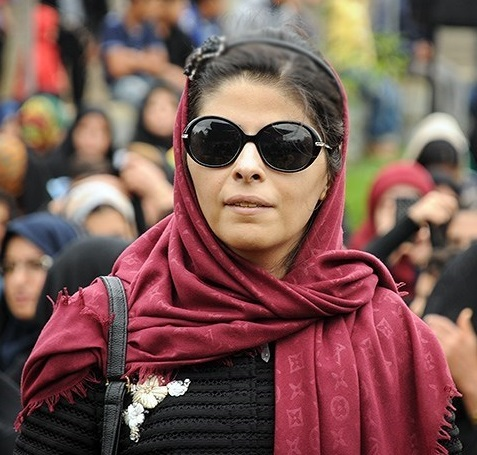
- Born: November 20, 1977 (age 48); Tehran, Iran
- Occupations: Poet, songwriter, writer and painter
- Writing career
- Period: 1996–present

Maryam Heydarzadeh (Persian: مریم حیدرزاده; born November 20, 1977) is a contemporary Iranian poet, lyricist, singer and painter.

Heydarzadeh is blind. She writes simple, yet deep poetry, almost always about the state of being in love. Some Iranian singers have created songs using her poetry.

== Lyrics ==
Singer	Lyric	Composer	Arrangement
Mahasti	Asked by God	Shadmehr Aghili	Shadmehr Aghili
Mahasti	patience	Shadmehr Aghili	Shadmehr Aghili
Mahasti	Exam	Shadmehr Aghili	Shadmehr Aghili
Mahasti	Maybe	Shadmehr Aghili	Shadmehr Aghili
Mahasti	When I left	Shadmehr Aghili	Shadmehr Aghili
Leila Forouhar	My Moon	Ramin Zamani	Vachik & Howie
Leila Forouhar	To you	Ramin Zamani	Roma Kanyan
Leila Forouhar	So hard	Ramin Zamani	Ramin Zamani
Leila Forouhar	is it possible	Ramin Zamani	Ramin Zamani
Leila Forouhar	Excuse	Ramin Zamani	Pooria Niakan
Leila Forouhar	this is my dream	Ramin Zamani	Ramin Zamani
Aref	I give you a gift	Ramin Zamani	
Dariush	Our promise by the sea	Ramin Zamani	Ramin Zamani
Hengameh	Painting	Ramin Zamani	Ramin Zamani
Hengameh	Never without you	Ramin Zamani	Shahram Azar
Hengameh	A trip	Ramin Zamani	Shahram Azar
Hengameh	Permit	Ramin Zamani	Ramin Zamani
Hengameh	Either you or no one else	Ramin Zamani	Ramin Zamani
Hengameh	Excuse	Ramin Zamani	Ramin Zamani
Hengameh	Dua	Ramin Zamani	Ramin Zamani
Hengameh	When he left	Ramin Zamani	Ramin Zamani
Hengameh	Miracle	Ramin Zamani	Ramin Zamani
Hengameh	When you came in my heart	Ramin Zamani	-
Mehrdad Asemani	Persepolis	Mehrdad Asemani	-
Kamran & Hooman	you are the best	Kamran & Hooman	Payam Shams
Kamran & Hooman	If the world was my hand	Kamran & Hooman	Payam Shams
Kamran & Hooman	saving angel	Ramin Zamani	Ramin Zamani
Kamran & Hooman	When you love someone	Ramin Zamani	Ramin Zamani
Kamran & Hooman	yours	Payam Shams	Payam Shams
Kamran & Hooman	Jealous	Ramin Zamani	Farhad Zand
Kamran & Hooman	Empty	Ramin Zamani	Ramin Zamani
Kamran & Hooman	I'm getting crazy	Aref Shakouri	Aref Shakouri
Kamran & Hooman	I did not expect from you	Kamran & Hooman	Aref Shakouri
Kamran & Hooman / Ebi	Isn't the angel bad too?	Ramin Zamani	Ramin Zamani
Beti	Remember	Parviz Ghadarkhani	Parviz Ghadarkhani
Sepideh	I want to die for you	Ramin Zamani	Shubert Avakian
Sepideh	do you remember	Ramin Zamani	Shubert Avakian
Saman	Candlesticks	Saman	Manouchehr Cheshm Azar
Saman	Letter	Saman	-
Saman	Canary	Saman	Saman
Khashayar Etemadi	Song until the resurrection	Touraj ShabanAli	Shadmehr Aghili
Khashayar Etemadi	Conversation	Touraj ShabanAli	Shadmehr Aghili
Khashayar Etemadi	like nobody	Touraj ShabanAli	Shadmehr Aghili
Khashayar Etemadi	for me	Touraj ShabanAli	Shadmehr Aghili
Khashayar Etemadi	Song For You	Touraj ShabanAli	Fardin Khalatbari
Khashayar Etemadi	The privacy of a poet	Touraj ShabanAli	Fardin Khalatbari
Khashayar Etemadi	A basket of raw wishes	Touraj ShabanAli	Fardin Khalatbari
Khashayar Etemadi	Unanswered letters	Touraj ShabanAli	Fardin Khalatbari
Khashayar Etemadi	Under the wish tree	Touraj ShabanAli	Fardin Khalatbari
Khashayar Etemadi	Hava-e Raftan	Touraj ShabanAli	Foad Hejazi
Mohammad Mohebian	If you were mine	-	Farokh Ahi
Farideh	I'm crazy about you	Shadmehr Aghili	Shadmehr Aghili
Mojtaba Kabiri	Opposite instrument	Pedram Keshtkar	Pedram Keshtkar
Artin Shahvaran	I want you	Artin Shahvaran	Afshin Shahvaran
Mojtaba Kabiri	Never without you	Pedram Keshtkar	Pedram Keshtkar
Mojtaba Kabiri	I ran	Pedram Keshtkar	Pedram Keshtkar
Mojtaba Kabiri	Forgive me	Pedram Keshtkar	Pedram Keshtkar
Mojtaba Kabiri	Velvet begging	Pedram Keshtkar	Pedram Keshtkar
Mojtaba Kabiri	Delight	Pedram Keshtkar	Pedram Keshtkar
Mojtaba Kabiri	A simple lie	Pedram Keshtkar	Pedram Keshtkar
Mojtaba Kabiri	Restlessness	Pedram Keshtkar	Pedram Keshtkar
Mohsen Chavoshi	Curse	Mohsen Chavoshi	Mohsen Chavoshi
Mohsen Chavoshi	The hard way	Mohsen Chavoshi	Mohsen Chavoshi
Mohsen Chavoshi	Mother's strange	Mohsen Chavoshi	Mohsen Chavoshi
Mohsen Chavoshi	Singer	Mohsen Chavoshi	Mohsen Chavoshi
Tara	Do not look at my love	Pedram Keshtkar	Alex Abedi
Shahab Tiam	the accident	Pourya Niakan	Pourya Niakan
Shahab Tiam	Destiny	Pourya Niakan	Pourya Niakan
Mohsen Ebrahimzadeh	An unassuming hero	Mohsen Ebrahimzadeh	Mostafa Momeni
Mohsen Ebrahimzadeh	The smell of rain	Mohsen Ebrahimzadeh	Mostafa Momeni
Mohsen Ebrahimzadeh	Nights of Madness	Mohsen Ebrahimzadeh	Mostafa Momeni
