= Yaghma Golrouyi =

Persian songwriter, writer and poet (born 1975)

Yaghma Golrouyi یغما گلرویی
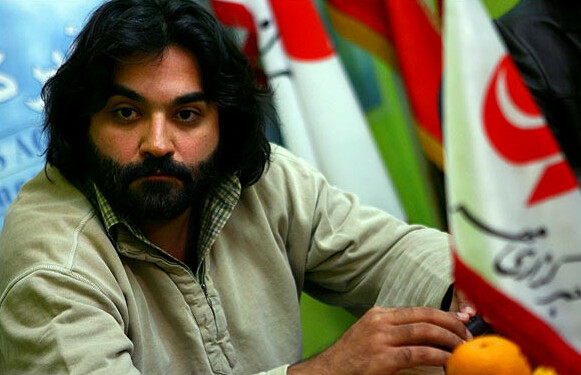
- Born: July 28, 1975 (age 51); Urmia, Iran
- Other name: Galile (گلایل)
- Occupations: lyricist, poet, writer, and translator

Yaghma Golrouyi (Persian: یغما گلرویی; born July 28, 1975) is an Iranian lyricist, poet, writer, and translator. Notable works by Golrouyi include "Khaste Shodam" (I Am Tired), "Royaei" (Dream), "Setareh" (Star), "Ziāfat" (Feast), and "Kuche Melli" (National Street).

== Biography ==
Yaghma Golrouyi was born on the twenty-eighth day of the month of July in 1975 at the "Mehr" Hospital in Urmia. In collaboration with Afshin Yadollahi, Niloufar Laripour, Saeed Amir Aslani, Afshin Siahpoosh, and Mehdi Mohtasham, he organized singing sessions at his father's house, leading to the establishment of the "Khaneh-ye Taraneh" (House of Song). After about a decade, he parted ways with the group due to disagreements about the conduct of the sessions, as mentioned in a note he wrote.

In the month of May in the year 1998, Golrouyi published his first collection of poems titled "Goftam: Beman! Nemand..." (I Said: Stay! He/She Didn't...), released by the Daryanoush Cultural-Artistic Institute. Following this, Golrouyi's works, spanning poetry, songwriting, translation, and screenplay, have been published in various mediums.

== Professional career ==
Karimi was the first singer to incorporate Golrouyi's poetry into his album "Ta Hamishe" (Forever). However, it was Naser Abdollahi's album "Dooset Daram" (I Love You) that marked the initial release of an album featuring two songs written by Golrouyi. In 2003, Siavash Ghomayshi used Golrouyi's lyrics in several songs from the album "Neghab" (Mask), significantly contributing to Golrouyi's recognition. This collaboration continued through the album "Ragbar."

On February 29, 2012, Shahin Najafi released his fourth album, "Hich Hich Hich," featuring two songs written by Golrouyi. Golrouyi continued his collaboration with Najafi in the albums "Tramadol" and "Sa." However, their collaboration ended after Golrouyi made critical statements about Najafi in interviews.

In 2015, Ahmad Pouri revealed that an individual had compiled translations of Golrouyi's works along with other translators' works, publishing them under their own name. Pouri did not mention the person's name, resulting in critiques of 16 poetry books translated into French, English, Italian, Spanish, Arabic, Turkish, and Kurdish by Golrouyi. In response, Golrouyi issued a strong statement in defense of himself.

In 2016, news agencies announced that the song "Death to America" would be performed with a song by Yaghma Golrouyi and the voice of Kaveh Afagh, sparking various implications and reflections in the artistic community.

Also, in the same year, Owj Arts and Media Organization, affiliated with the Islamic Revolutionary Guard Corps, confirmed Yaghma Golrouyi's cooperation in composing songs for the music videos "Life Style in Old Tehran" and "Maqam Shahada" (The value of martyrs). It was clarified that this approval does not endorse Golrouyi or his actions.

== Works ==
Golrouyi has published numerous works, including poetry, short stories, and translations. His songs have been performed by various artists such as Ebi, Shadmehr Aghili, Siavash Ghomayshi, Amir Karimi, Hassan Shamaeizadeh, Omid Soltani, Shahin Najafi, Naser Abdollahi, Ghasem Afshar, Saeed Shahrouz, and Reza Yazdani.

Two notable songs from Golrouyi's repertoire are "Tasavvor Kon" (Imagine) from Siavash Ghomayshi's album Roozhaye Bi-Khatereh (Forgettable Days) and "Setareh" (Star) from Shadmehr Aghili's album Adam va Havaye Shadmehr.

In recent years, Golrouyi has been prominently featured on Islamic Republic of Iran Broadcasting (IRIB), providing vocals for the title track of Ramadan series, such as the Medina series.

He has also lent his voice to television commercial jingles, notably the "Delicious Sauce" campaign.
