= Leila Kasra =

Leila Kasra (Hedieh) (لیلا کسری (هدیه
- Also known as: Hedieh, هدیه
- Born: Leila Kasra; March 27, 1939; Tehran, Iran
- Died: May 16, 1989 (aged 50) Los Angeles, California, U.S.A
- Occupations: Poet, Lyricist
- Years active: 1959–1989
- Website: Official Site

Leila Kasra (Persian: لیلا کسری; 1939–1989) also known as Hedieh (Persian: هدیه), (March 27, 1939 – May 16, 1989) was a prominent Iranian contemporary poet and lyricist who has written lyrics for notable artists including Ebi, Dariush, Sattar, Vigen, Moein, Mahasti, Andy, Homeyra, Morteza, Hassan Shamaizadeh, Siavash Shams and many more. She was best known for writing more than 30 songs for Hayedeh.

== Biography ==
Leila Kasra was born on March 27, 1939, in Tehran. After graduating from high school in Tehran, Kasra moved to England to continue her education where she got a bachelor's degree in English literature from King's College London. When she returned to Iran, she was hired in the Iran Petrochemical Commercial Company, but she left the job to pursue a career in poetry. In 1956 she wrote columns for the magazines Omide Iran, Roshanfekr, Etelate Banouan. In 1959 her first poem was published in Etelate Banouan. In 1969 Kasra published two poetry books. One of her books co-won the Television poetry contest and she shared the award with Manouchehr Atashi. In 1975 after Fereydoun Khoshnoud's request Kasra started writing songs and became a lyricist for artists like Elaheh and Hayedeh. The first song she wrote was "Doayeh Sahar" sung by Hayedeh. Before the revolution, she wrote famous memorable songs for artists like Hayedeh, Nooshafarin, Elaheh, Ebi, Sattar, Mahasti, Golpa and Nasrin.

Like many Persian artists Kasra moved to the United States after the Iranian Revolution. After the revolution, Kasra chose to write songs under the name "Hedieh". She wrote countless memorable songs for many artists, mostly for Hayedeh, who was a very close friend of hers. She also wrote many songs for new artists like Andy & Kouros, Shohreh, Siavash and many more.

In 1986 Leila Kasra wrote the song "Tanine Solh" about the Iran–Iraq War, and it was performed by Andy & Kouros, Fataneh, Moein, and Morteza.

Two of the songs she had written and were sung by Andy were used in the soundtrack of the 2003 motion picture House of Sand and Fog.

== Personal life ==
Kasra was married to Eskandar Afshar and had three sons Jahanshah, Amir-Pasha and Alidad. Her youngest son Ali Afshar is an actor and producer in Los Angeles.

== Illness and death ==
In 1977 Kasra was diagnosed with breast cancer. In the following years she was constantly battling breast cancer. The song "Gheseye Man" performed by Hayedeh and written by Kasra in 1984 is about her suffering and her illness. On Tuesday May 16, 1989, after a twelve-year battle with breast cancer, and seventeen surgeries Leila Kasra died in Century City Hospital in Los Angeles. On Sunday May 21, 1989 Kasra was buried in Forest Lawn Memorial Park in Los Angeles. Her funeral was attended by many artists such as Sattar, Homeyra, Andy, Hassan Shamaizadeh, Shahram Shabpareh, Alireza Amirghassemi, Morteza, Soosan and many more.

Hayedeh, a famous Iranian singer and one of her close friends, died of a heart attack only 8 months after her.

== Lyrical contributions ==
- "Asireh Tou" by Hayedeh
- "Ashiouneh" by Hayedeh
- "Baadeh Foroush" by Hayedeh
- "Dastayeh Tou" by Hayedeh
- "Dele Divooneh" by Hayedeh
- "Doayeh Sahar" by Hayedeh
- "Eshareh" by Hayedeh
- "Ey Khoda" by Hayedeh
- "Ey Zendegi Salam" by Hayedeh
- "Ghalbam Gereft" by Hayedeh
- "Ghesseyeh Man" by Hayedeh
- "Jadoo" by Hayedeh
- "Kharabati" by Hayedeh
- "Man Mikham Be Khouneyeh Khoda Beram" by Hayedeh
- "Nameh" by Hayedeh
- "Nargeseh Shiraz" by Hayedeh
- "Parishoon" by Hayedeh
- "Paaeez" by Hayedeh
- "Sayeh Eshgh" by Hayedeh
- "Shabeh Meykhooneh" by Hayedeh
- "Shabeh Eshgh" by Hayedeh
- "Shabeh Eyd" by Hayedeh
- "Siah Cheshmoon" by Hayedeh
- "Sogand" by Hayedeh
- "Tarikheh Eshgh" by Hayedeh
- "Tou Keh Nisti" by Hayedeh
- "Vay Beh Halesh" by Hayedeh
- "Vasat Mimiram" by Hayedeh
- "Ya Rab" by Hayedeh
- "Atreh Bahar" by Mahasti
- "Asir" by Mahasti
- "Bas Kon" by Mahasti
- "Bi Mohabat" by Mahasti
- "Delam" by Mahasti
- "Ba Tou Ashegh" by Mahasti
- "Key Miad" by Mahasti
- "Khoobe man" by Mahasti
- "Modara" by Mahasti
- "Ghameh Donya" by Mahasti
- "Shakhe Nabat" by Mahasti
- "Taghsireh Toust" by Mahasti
- "Ageh Dashtam Tou Ro" by Moein
- "Chegooneh Chegooneh" by Moein
- "Bi Bi Gol 2" by Moein
- "Delam Gereft Az Asemoon" Moein
- "Namaaz" by Moein
- "Safar" by Moein
- "Safayeh Ashk" by Moein
- "Tanaz" by Moein
- "Vay Beh Halesh" by Moein
- "Kolbeh Man" by Ebi
- "Geryeyeh Masti" by Ebi
- "Gharibeh" by Ebi
- "Ghased" by Ebi
- "Gheseye Eshgh" by Ebi
- "Shab Mardeh Tanhaei" by Ebi
- "Shirin Shirin" by Dariush
- "Tekyeh Bar Baad" by Dariush
- "Alameh Eshgh" by Homeyra
- "Ine Donya" by Homeyra
- "Darya Kenar" by Homeyra
- "Aroosi" by Sattar
- "Amou Norouz" by Sattar
- "Ashti" by Sattar
- "Che Ghashangeh Asheghi" by Sattar
- "Haraas" by Sattar
- "Gol Naz" by Sattar
- "Madar" by Sattar
- "Sefid o Siah" by Sattar
- "Sedayeh Zangoolehaa" by Sattar
- "Dele Ghafel" by Viguen
- "Hazarateh Adam" by Viguen
- "Majnoon"by Aref
- "Ay Ashegha"by Aref
- "Khosham Khosham" by Hassan Shamaizadeh
- "Az Hamoon Jadeh Bia" by Hassan Shamaizadeh
- "Balla" by Andy&Kouros
- "Akheh Nisti Ashegh" by Andy&Kouros
- "Tou" by Andy&Kouros
- "Nemiyay" by Andy&Kouros
- "Atish" by Andy&Kouros
- "Eshgheh Masmoum" by Andy&Kouros
- "Salame Aasheghooneh" by Andy
- "Sahraei" by Andy
- "Tanine Solh" by Andy
- "Aziz" by Morteza
- "Baghe Asal" by Morteza
- "Dobareh Eshgh" by Morteza
- "Saheb" by Morteza
- "Jalad" by Morteza
- "Gole Sharab" by Morteza
- "Salame Aasheghouneh" by Morteza
- "Vaveyla" by Morteza
- "Yaro Yar" by Morteza
- "Ehsaseh Zan" by Shohreh
- "Yavashaki" by Shohreh
- "Sheytounak" by Shohreh
- "Barikala" by Shahram Solati
- "Honey" by Shahram Solati
- "Khoda Hafez" by Shahram Solati
- "Mard Eshgh" by Shahram Solati
- "Khanoomeh" by Shahram Solati
- "Goleh Aftab Gardoon" by Nooshafarin
- "Ghasedak" by Nooshafarin
- "Kakoli" by Nooshafarin
- "Rahebeh" by Nooshafarin
- "Sarzamineh Shab" by Nooshafarin
- "Hava" by Nooshafarin
- "Male Mani" by Siavash Shams
- "Dokhtar Irouni" by Siavash Shams
- "Naaz Nakon" by Siavash Shams
- "Ghahro Ashti(Zendegi)" by Siavash Shams
- "Nagou Kieh" by Siavash Shams
- "Hamsayeha" by Siavash Shams
- "Tanine Solh (Solhe Sepido Abi)" by Andy & Kouros, Fataneh, Moein, and Morteza
- "Hamraz" by Habib
- "Ghesseyeh Mehrabouni" by Habib
- "Chang" by Farzin
- "Mashougheh" by Farzin
- "Migam Na by Hobob
- "Salame Asheghoune" by Hobob
- "Beegharare Eshgh" by Hobob
- "Beegharare Eshgh" by Nahid
- "Kolbeh (2009)" by Kamran & Hooman feat. Ebi

== See also ==
- Shahyar Ghanbari
- Ebi
- Mina Assadi
- Mahasti
- Forugh Farrokhzad
