= Black Cats (band) =

Persian pop group in Los Angeles

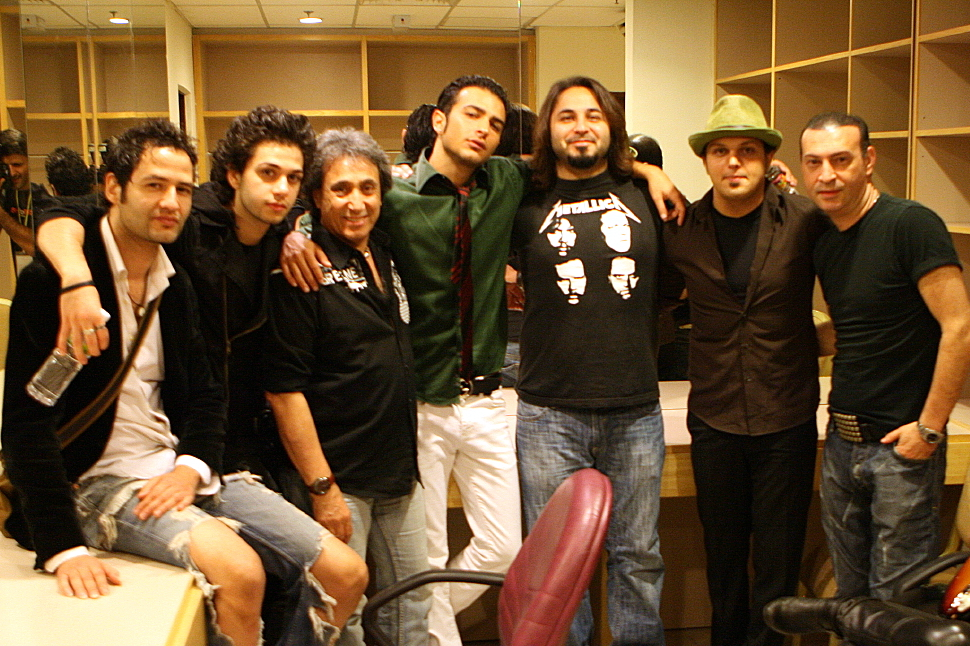
- Black Cats in 2009

Background information
- Origin: Los Angeles, California, United States; Tehran, Iran (1960–1979)
- Genres: Persian Pop
- Years active: 1960–present
- Labels: Caltex Records, Taraneh Records, Avang Music, Seda Records
- Members: Shahbal Shabpareh; Mani Abtahi; Manoosh Abtahi
- Past members: Farhad Mehrad (1967–?); Ebi (1967–1979); Shahram Shabpareh (1964–1979); Pyruz & David (1992–1999); Kamran & Hooman (1999–2004); Kamyar & Hakim (2004–2008); Sami & Eddie Attar (2008–2009); Edvin (2013–2016); Hazhar Saleh & Milad J (2019–2020); Hazhar Saleh (2020–2024)
- Website: www.instagram.com/blackcatsband/

Black Cats (Persian: بلک کتس) is an Iranian American Persian pop and rock group originally formed in Tehran, Iran, in the 1960s by Shahbal Shabpareh who has remained the bands primary member, producer and manager till present day. The group later re-established itself in Los Angeles following the Iranian Revolution and became one of the most commercially successful and influential Persian pop groups among Iranians internationally. Over several decades, the band served as a launching platform for numerous prominent Iranian singers and performers, including Farhad Mehrad, Ebi, Shahram Shabpareh and Kamran & Hooman. n

== Background ==
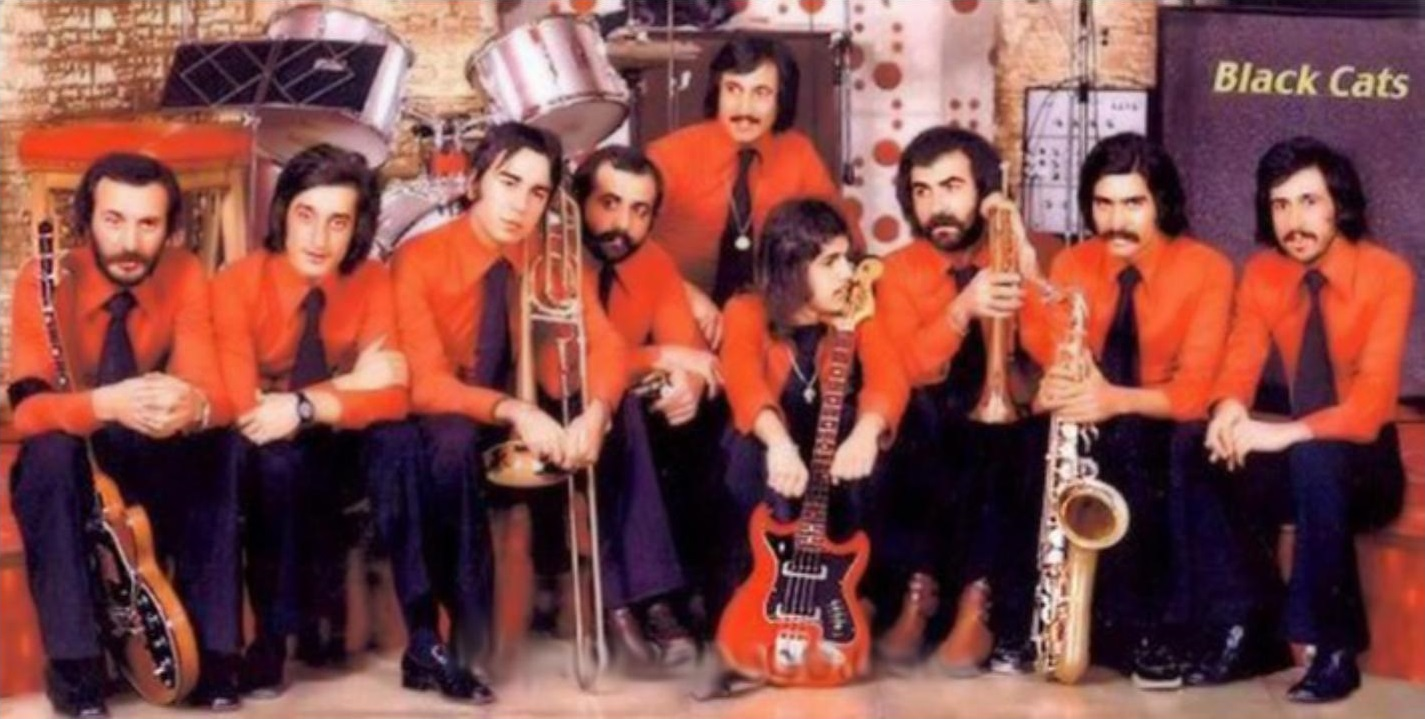
Black Cats in the 1960s, with Ebi 2nd from the left, Shahbal Shabpareh in the middle and Sharam Shabpareh on the right.

Formation and early years (1960s – 1970s)

The Black Cats were formed in Tehran during the 1960s by Shahbal Shabpareh. Emerging during a period of increasing western musical influence in Iran, the group became known for blending Persian pop music with elements of rock, funk, and dance music. The band gained popularity among younger audiences in pre-revolution Iran through live performances (both in Tehran and Shiraz), television appearances, and recordings.

Throughout the 1960s and 1970s, the Black Cats featured a few rotating singers / performers and musicians such as Farhad Mehrad, Shahram Shabpareh, and Ebi whom later established successful solo careers. The group became associated with Iran's evolving pop music industry and performed regularly in major entertainment venues in Tehran and Shiraz.

Relocation to Los Angeles and revival

Following the 1979 Iranian revolution, members of the group relocated to Los Angeles, California, where the Black Cats were later re-established as part of a growing Iranian diaspora entertainment scene. From 1992 to 1999, Shahbal Shabpareh had the band enter its first new era under Pyruz and David, a period often associated with the group's revival and renewed popularity among the Iranian fans and new audiences with albums Pool, Fever, and Spell of the Cats.

Following the departure of Pyruz in 1999, the Black Cats entered a new phase featuring brothers Kamran & Hooman as lead members. Between 1999 and 2002, the group adopted a more contemporary pop oriented sound and gained popularity among younger Persian audiences through music videos, live performances, and international concerts. This period is regarded as one of the band's most commercially successful modern eras with two albums (Cinderella and The Popfather) and helped further establish Kamran & Hooman before the duo later pursued an independent career.

From 2004 to 2008, the Black Cats introduced a new lineup featuring Kamyr as lead singer and bass player Hakim Rachek. During this period, the group continued its transition toward a modern pop and dance oriented style incorporating contemporary production and performance elements, with the help of Schubert Avakian on their album (Black Cats Next Level) aimed at younger international Persian audiences. The lineup remained active through live performances and music video releases, continuing the group's multi-generational presence within the Persian pop music scene.

Between 2008 and 2009, the Black Cats featured Sami Beigi and Eddie Attar as part of a new lineup associated with the release of the album Dimbology. During this era, the group continued to explore contemporary pop and dance influences while maintaining the performance driven style that characterized the band's later Los Angeles periods.

From 2013 to 2016, the Black Cats featured Edvin as the group's lead vocalist during a period marked by continued live performances and evolving contemporary pop influences. Following Edvin's departure, Hazhar assumed the role of lead singer with a brief run with Milad J. Hazhar remained with the group through 2024.

== Style ==
The band's music is traditional upbeat style of Persian pop, but are also known to blend in Jazz, R&B, Hip-Hop, Reggae, Rave and Rapcore influences into their music. Most their beats and timing is in traditional Persian shesh-o-hast format, meaning 6/8th, but often songs switch back and forth from 6/8 to 4/4 rock or pop format. Shabpareh calls it "rock dambuli."

== Partial discography ==
=== Albums ===
Title	Year	Label	Vocals
Pool	1992	Taraneh Records	Pyruz, David
Fever	1993	Caltex Records	Pyruz, David
Afsoone Gorbehaye Siah (Spell of the Cats)	1996	Caltex Records	Pyruz, David
Cinderella	1999	Caltex Records	Kamran, Hooman
The PopFather	2003	Caltex Records	Kamran, Hooman
Scream of the Cats	2006	Caltex Records	Kamyar, Hakim
Dimbology	2009	Caltex Records	Sami, Eddie Attar
Rise of the Cats	2022	Avang Music	Hazhar Saleh

=== Singles (since 2018) ===
- 2018, Radsho
- 2019, Bavar Kon
- 2019, Cheshmak
- 2019, Jonoon
- 2020, Koja Miri Be In Zoodi
- 2025, Mobham
- 2025, Monster
- 2025, Naaz
- 2025, Najoor
- 2025, Saadeh
