= Khashayar Etemadi =

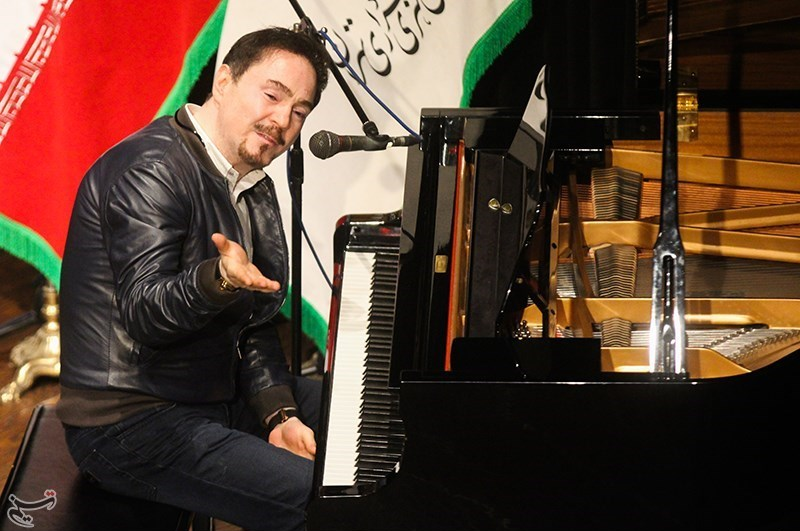
- Born: March 31, 1971 (age 55); Iran
- Occupation: singer
- Musical career
- Genres: Persian Pop
- Instruments: Vocals; guitar; piano; keyboard
- Years active: 1995–present

Khashayar Etemadi (Persian: خشایار اعتمادی, born March 31, 1971) is an Iranian singer. He is the singer of the first pop music album in Iran after the revolution.

== Biography ==
He was born in Tehran on April 3, 1981. At the age of 4, he learned to work with Melodica and at the age of 5, he learned to play the accordion. Etemadi started singing at the age of 6 and started learning and playing the piano at the age of 13. Khashayar Etemadi started working in the field of music at the age of fifteen. In 1974, he entered the world of music with the secret of Hafez and became famous by singing the song "Baron" with a poem by Ahmad Shamlou. Etemadi has performed extensively and participated in three festivals, including the Pop Festival, two international festivals in Iran, and the Sarajevo W.O.M.F International Muslim Music Festival. He is a graduate of Business Economics.

Among the songwriters who have worked with Khashayar Etemadi, we can mention the following people:

Afshin Yadollahi, Roozbeh Bemani, Maryam Delshad, Akbar Azad, Afshin Siahpoosh, Afshin Moghadam, Babak Sahraei, Fatemeh Jafari, Maryam Heydarzadeh and Pouya Kasra.

== Discography ==
=== Albums ===
- Leila
- Dilshoreh (1998)
- Remember
- Your lady
- like nobody
- Taene
- He fell in love with everyone
- God forgive you
- I have to go back to you
- You are doomed to return

=== Singles ===
- You thought late
- please
- I came back
- I have one word left in my heart
- Perennial love
- Beht (with Yasser Davoudian)
- Associate
- Game Cum
- Why are you so beautiful
- Just ask me
- Letter
- Appreciation
- Ali (AS)
- Bam earthquake
- Keshavarz (3 songs)

== See also ==
- Afshin Yadollahi
