= Andy & Kouros =

Persian pop duo

Andy & Kouros اندی و کورس

Background information
- Origin: Iran
- Genres: Pop
- Years active: 1985-1991; Reunions at various dates: 2002, 2004, 2009, 2010
- Past members: Andranik "Andy" Madadian; Kouros Shahmiri

Andy & Kouros (Persian: اندی و کورس) were an Iranian pop duo formed in Los Angeles in the mid-1980s, consisting of Andranik "Andy" Madadian and Kouros Shahmiri. Active until 1991, they released four studio albums—Khastegary (1985), Parvaz (1987), Balla (1990), and Goodbye (1991)—on diaspora labels including Pars Video and Caltex Records, before pursuing solo careers. They have occasionally reunited for performances and collaborations, including a later remake of their song "Niloufar".

Andy and Kouros released four albums: Khastegary (1985), Parvaz (1987), the hugely successful Balla (1990), and finally Goodbye (1991). Throughout their career, they often performed along with various other artists, such as Shahram Shabpareh, Shohreh Solati, Dariush Eghbali, Siavash Shams, Jaklin Viguen (the daughter of Viguen) and Toofan.

Andy and Kouros split in 1991. To commemorate their contributions to Persian pop, a documentary was released focusing on their career which featured interviews with various Persian celebrities and singers to give their opinion on the duo, such as Shohreh Aghdashloo (who would later co-star with Andy in House of Sand and Fog), Aref Arefkia, Manoochehr, Shahram Shabpareh (who claimed that he saw the duo as little brothers), Leila Forouhar, Bijan Mortazavi, Hassan Shamaizadeh and Siavash Shams. Fans of the duo were also interviewed to express their opinions on the group splitting. In an interview, Andy and Kouros themselves claimed that their split was due to work, and gave their thanks to their fans for their support.

Following their split, Andy and Kouros each went on to have successful solo careers, though they reunited occasionally, such as Andy singing along with Kouros in one song in the latter's Gates of Love album. In 2002 and 2004, they performed together for a sold-out audience in San Jose, California; in 2009, they went on an international tour together in the Iranian diaspora; and performed together again in May 2010. They also appeared together in a music video by Farez remaking their hit song "Niloufar".

== Discography ==
=== Studio albums ===
Year	Title	Notable Tracks	Notes
1985	Khastegary (خواستگاری)	"Three of Us" "Madar"	Initial release on cassette (later reissued on CD in 1992).
1987	Parvaz (پرواز)	"Chi Mishod" "Restless" "Niloufar" "Topoli" "Restless"	Widely circulated later in digital form (1992 CD/digital listings).
1990	Balla (بلا)	"Balla" "Leila" "Negah" "Sheytoon Bala" "Khodaye Asemoonha" "Don't Go Away"	Release documented by label/retail metadata.
1991	Goodbye	"Strange Love" "Yasaman"	Contemporary retailer listing with date/track list.

== Context and legacy ==
The duo's output is often associated with the post-revolution "Tehrangeles" pop scene centered in Los Angeles, where Persian-language labels and television built a transnational audience for Iranian popular music during the 1980s and 1990s.
