= Mehrdad Nosrati =

Iranian composer, arranger and singer (born 1974)

Mehrdad Nosrati مهرداد نصرتی
- Born: December 24, 1974 (age 50) tehran, Iran
- Genres: Pop
- Occupations: singer, songwriter
- Instruments: Saxophone, Flute, Oboe, Clarinet, Piano
- Years active: 2000–present

Mehrdad Nosrati (Persian: مهرداد نصرتی;born December 24, 1974, in Tehran) is an Iranian composer, arranger and singer. In his artistic career, he has a history of collaborating with prominent singers such as Nasser Abdollahi, Reza Sadeghi, Roozbeh Nemat Olahi, Behnam Safavi, Saeed Shahrooz, Amir Tajik, Ehsan Khajeh Amiri.

== Life ==
Mehrdad Nosrati was born on January 24, 1974, in Tehran (Piroozi St., Coca-Cola). He was born into a middle-class family. His father was a carpenter and his mother a housewife. He has two brothers and two sisters and is the second child in the family. In 1980, they emigrated to Hamedan and in 1984, he became acquainted with music. The whole family was interested in music and art and was always encouraged, so his brother Mohammad Nosrati started learning music before him. He started with flute and then alto and soprano saxophone; And he learned very quickly and in 1987 he won the first place in playing the saxophone at the Ramsar Festival. [5] He went to the front and performed in Sardasht, Baneh, Ahvaz, Abadan and Susangard with his brother and the Hamedan Military Orchestra. In high school, he participated in provincial anthem competitions every year by forming a choir at school and won several prizes; He performed in various ceremonies and programs. He became acquainted with the theater around 1987. He started acting and performing music in the theater and was involved in composing play music for many years. He composed music in the show and began to shine.

From 1371 to 1374, he won the award for best composition at the National Festival of Children and Adolescents

In the same years, he became acquainted with the Young Filmmakers Association, and because he was very interested in making film music, he sounded and composed for short and semi-long films of eight and sixteen millimeters. In 1372, he received the award for the best music and voice for the film "sokhanrani" made by Hassan Solhjoo.

== Albums (translated titles) ==
Under the Sky City (Amir Tajik 2002)

Scent of sultry (Nasser Abdollahi Zelf Raha 2002)

Air of Eve (Nasser Abdollahi Bi Hemta 2003)

Mandegar (Nasser Abdollahi 2006)

New Season (Ehsan Khajeh Amiri 2008)

A Memory of Tomorrow (Ehsan Khajeh Amiri 1389)

Autumn Alone (Ehsan Khajeh Amiri 2014)

== Activity ==
Row	Song	Singer	Songwriter	Music	tuning
1	Nemidoni	Ehsan Khajeamiri	Mehrdad Nosrati	Ehsan Khajeamiri	Amir Pirnahan
2	Shirin	Ehsan Khajeamiri	Mehrdad Nosrati	Ali Sabet	Hossein Motevaliyan
3	Khoshbakhti	Ehsan Khajeamiri	Mehrdad Nosrati	Ali Sabet	Mona Bourzoei
4	haghighat dare	Ehsan Khajeamiri	Zahra Ameli	Mehrdad Nosrati	Ali Sabet
5	eshgh miyad	Ehsan Khajeamiri	Amir Pirnahan	Mehrdad Nosrati	Ali Sabet
6	Nemiduni	Ehsan Khajeamiri	Mona Bourzoei	Mehrdad Nosrati	Sirvan Khosravi
7	Daram-miyam-pishet	Ehsan Khajeamiri	Maryam Asadi	Mehrdad Nosrati	Mehrdad Nosrati
8	Donia-maro-nakhast	Ehsan Khajeamiri	Majid Afshari	Mehrdad Nosrati	Mehrdad Nosrati
9	Mozhde-bede	Ehsan Khajeamiri	Farzad Hasani	Mehrdad Nosrati	Mehrdad Nosrati
10	Atash	Ehsan Khajeamiri	Afshin Yadolahi	Mehrdad Nosrati	Iman Hojjat
11	Ghozashteha	Ehsan Khajeamiri	Hossein Ghiasi	Mehrdad Nosrati	Homan Namdari
12	Ba-toam	Ehsan Khajeamiri	Hossein Ghiasi	Mehrdad Nosrati	Iman Hojjat
13	Boughz (maheasal)	Ehsan Khajeamiri	Roozbeh Bemani	Mehrdad Nosrati	Homan Namdari
14	Zolferaha	Naser Abdoulahi	Yousef ali Mir Shakak	Mehrdad Nosrati	Naser Abdoulahi
15	Bi-hamta	Naser Abdoulahi	Mehdi karimi mansoub	Mehrdad Nosrati	behnam abtahi
16	Azadi	Naser Abdoulahi	Jafar Dehghani	Mehrdad Nosrati	Mehrdad Nosrati
17	dastenamarei shab	Naser Abdoulahi	Hossein Motevaliyan	Mehrdad Nosrati	Mehrdad Nosrati
18	Raz	Naser Abdoulahi	Nilufar Laripour	Mehrdad Nosrati	Mehrdad Nosrati
19	Khune	Naser Abdoulahi	mehdi mohtasham safa	Mehrdad Nosrati	Mehrdad Nosrati
20	Mehr ali va zahra	Naser Abdoulahi	Farzad Hasani	Mehrdad Nosrati	Mehrdad Nosrati
21	Koleposhti	Reza sadeghi	Farzad Hasani	Mehrdad Nosrati	Mehrdad Nosrati
22	Man ba toam	Reza sadeghi	Ahmad amir khalili	Mehrdad Nosrati	Ramiro
23	Jazr va mad	Mohammad alizadeh	Farzad Hasani	Mehrdad Nosrati	Mehrdad Nosrati
24	Deltangam	Mohammad alizadeh	hossein ghiasi	Mehrdad Nosrati	Shahab Akbari
25	Ye-masjed	Amir Tajik	Mehdi Shadmani	Mehrdad Nosrati	mehrdad nosrati
26	Khune	roozbe nematolahi	Zahra Ameli	Mehrdad Nosrati	Ramiro
27	Emrooziha	roozbe nematolahi	Ahmad Amirkhalili	Mehrdad Nosrati	Hamed Baradaran
28	Del shekaster	mohsen farahi	Mehdi Mohtashamsafa	Mehrdad Nosrati	Mehrdad Nosrati
