= Morteza (singer) =

Iranian singer (born 1951)

Morteza مرتضی
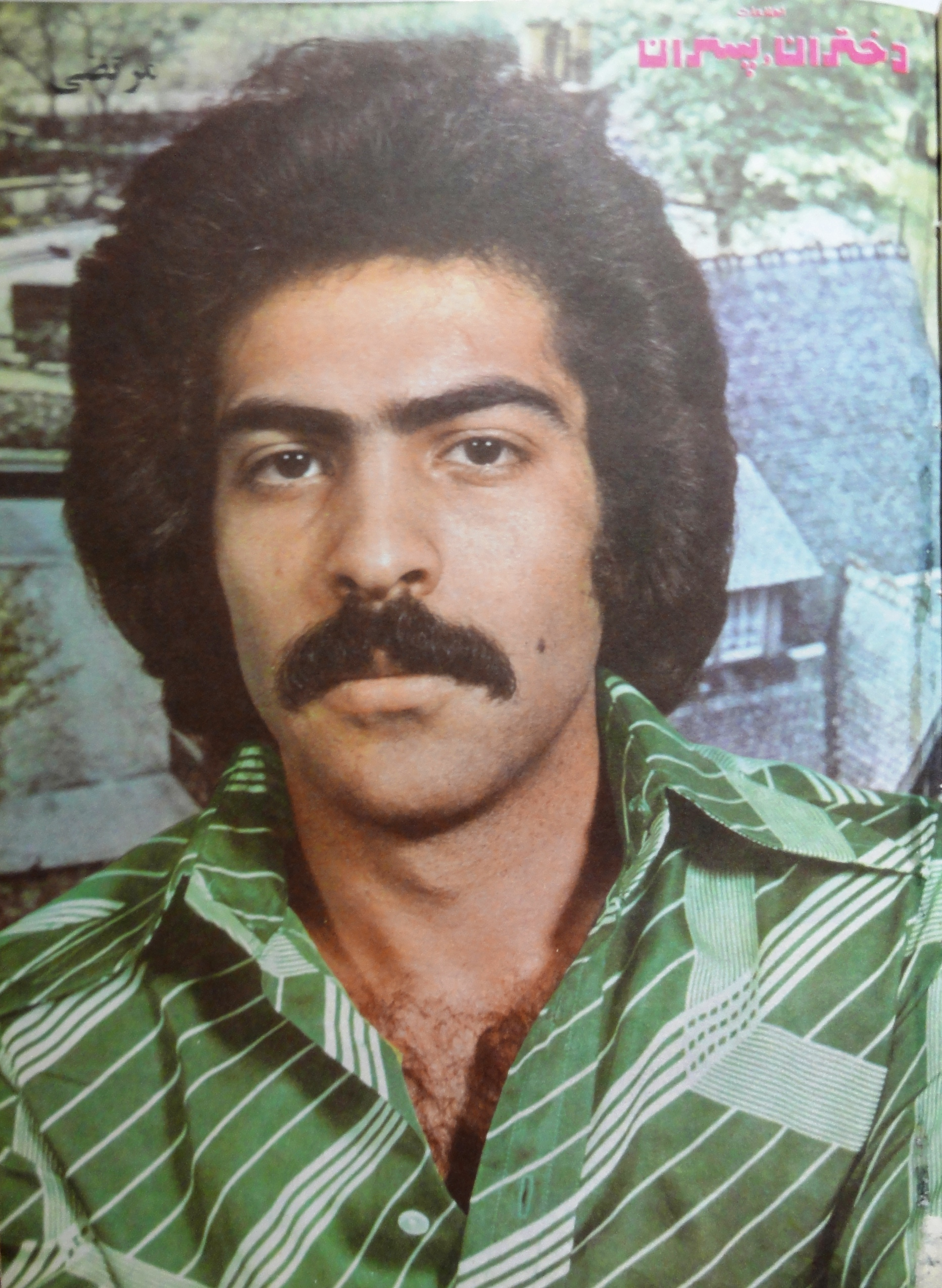
- Morteza in 1976

Background information
- Born: Morteza Barjesteh; 31 August 1951 (age 74); Tehran, Iran
- Genres: Persian Pop music
- Occupations: Singer; Songwriter; Humanitarian
- Years active: 1969–present
- Labels: Taraneh Records; Apolon Records; Caltex Records; Pars Video; Avang Records

Morteza Barjesteh (Persian: مرتضی برجسته), best known by his stage name Morteza (مرتضی), is an Iranian pop singer-songwriter and composer who gained fame in Iran during the 1980s.

== Early life ==
Morteza was born in Tehran and spent his early years there. Finishing primary and secondary education, he studied architecture and engaged in graphic designing. During the years of living in Iran, he worked with several advertising companies as a designer.

By the age of 16, Morteza started singing in Iranian movies. In 1969, he entered a singing festival in Mikhak-e Noghre-yi (Silver Carnation), a TV show which was performed by Fereydoon Farrokhzad and broadcast on Iran's national television for the first time, and won the competition. This was the beginning of his professional singing career.

== Musical career ==
His first song called "Eshgh-e Zood-gozar" ("fleeting love") was written by Masoud Hooshmand. The late Parviz Maghsadi composed the music for "Eshgh-e Zood-gozar".

Gradually thereafter, Morteza Barjasteh became known to people by his stage name, Morteza. Until the Islamic Revolution of Iran, he sang about 180 songs while cooperating with many Iranian songwriters and composers. He also sang about 50 songs for Iranian movies.

In 1981, two years after the Islamic Revolution, he left Iran for the United States and settled in Los Angeles.

He continued his artistic activities in the United States attending Iranian folk music and despite financial pressures, recorded two albums called "Dayeh Dayeh" ("nanny nanny") and "Anar Anar" ("pomegranate"), both of which were well received by the Iranian society. Considering the political conditions of Iran during the 1980s, he sang some political songs, the most prominent of which was "Darugheh" ("the sheriff") written by Masoud Amini.

Morteza also kept up graphic designing and designed the covers for some of his own albums and other artists' as well.

Since 2005, Morteza has also hosted a TV show called Navad (or 90).

== Activism ==
Following his artistic activities, he founded the cultural center of "Iran culture house" in 2002 in order to gather the Iranian society of the US together. The Iran culture house deals with social matters while doing cultural and artistic activities in the fields of theatre, music and so on and offering lectures and art classes.

After the 2009 election and the protests of a great majority of Iranians and their being oppressed by the government which eventually resulted in the formation of "Iranian Green Movement", Morteza has been one of the few singers who performed some songs in regards to the mentioned political events. The most outstanding of such songs was a bilingual one named "Hamishe ba Neda" ("united for Neda"). Composing the mentioned piece of music, he was accompanied by Dariush, Sattar and some of the other Iranian artists, such as Shohreh Aghdashloo, Parviz Sayyad, and some American artists.

== Discography ==
Morteza has recorded over 300 songs of which about 180 were sung in Iran and more than 130 in L.A. About 50 of his songs were performed in Persian films. His last album named "Sepasgozar" ("the grateful") published on the occasion of the 40s year of his artistic activity.

=== Studio albums ===
- Dayeh Dayeh (1983)
- Himeh (1984)
- Jang (1985)
- Darougheh (1986)
- Vaveyla (1988)
- Gol Agha (1990)
- Az Gol Ta Gol (1993)
- Robat (1995)
- Romance (1999)
- Sin Ti" (2000)
- Millennium Beat (2000)
- Donyaye Rangi (2002)
- Friends (2008)
- Sepasgozar (2009)

== See also ==
- Fereydoun Farrokhzad
- Leila Kasra
- Ebi
