= Live in Santa Monica =

Live in Santa Monica may refer to:

- Live in Santa Monica (Pink Floyd album), a bootleg recording
- Live in Santa Monica (Ebi album), released in 2001
- Live Santa Monica '72, David Bowie album, released in 2008
