= Live in Santa Monica (Ebi album) =

Live album by Ebi
- Released: October 16, 2001
- Recorded: March, 1994 at Santa Monica
- Genre: Pop
- Length: 113:43
- Label: Avang Records

Live in Santa Monica is a double live album by Iranian singer, Ebi, taped at the Santa Monica Civic Auditorium in March 1994.

== Album information ==
Live in Santa Monica was released on October 16, 2001". The performance also included covering Googoosh's Hit-songs, which appears on last track of the first volume.

== Track listing ==
Vol.1
No.	Title	Writer(s)	Length
1.	"Kolbeye Man" (from Khalij)		6:57
2.	"Pooste Sheer" (from Nazi Naz Kon)		6:10
3.	"Shekar" (from Khalij)	Hassan Shamaizadeh	3:46
4.	"Che Bayad Kard" (from Moalleme Bad)	Farid Zoland	3:01
5.	"Shab Zadeh" (from Shab Zadeh)		5:31
6.	"Medad Rangi" (from Khalij)		3:39
7.	"Medly" (Be Yade Googoosh)		23:56

Vol.2
No.	Title	Writer(s)	Length
1.	"Mohtaaj" (from Moalleme Bad)	Farid Zoland	5:49
2.	"Sabad Sabad" (from Ba To)		5:25
3.	"Persian Gulf Forever" (from Khalij)		7:29
4.	"Kavir"		4:40
5.	"Jabeye Javaaher" (from Koohe Yakh)	Siavash Ghomayshi	6:14
6.	"Ghorbat" (from Shab Zadeh)		8:33
7.	"Nazi Naz Kon" (from Nazi Naz Kon)		4:33
8.	"Shab"		3:39
9.	"Medly"		14:02
