= Andy (singer) =

Iranian singer and actor (born 1958)

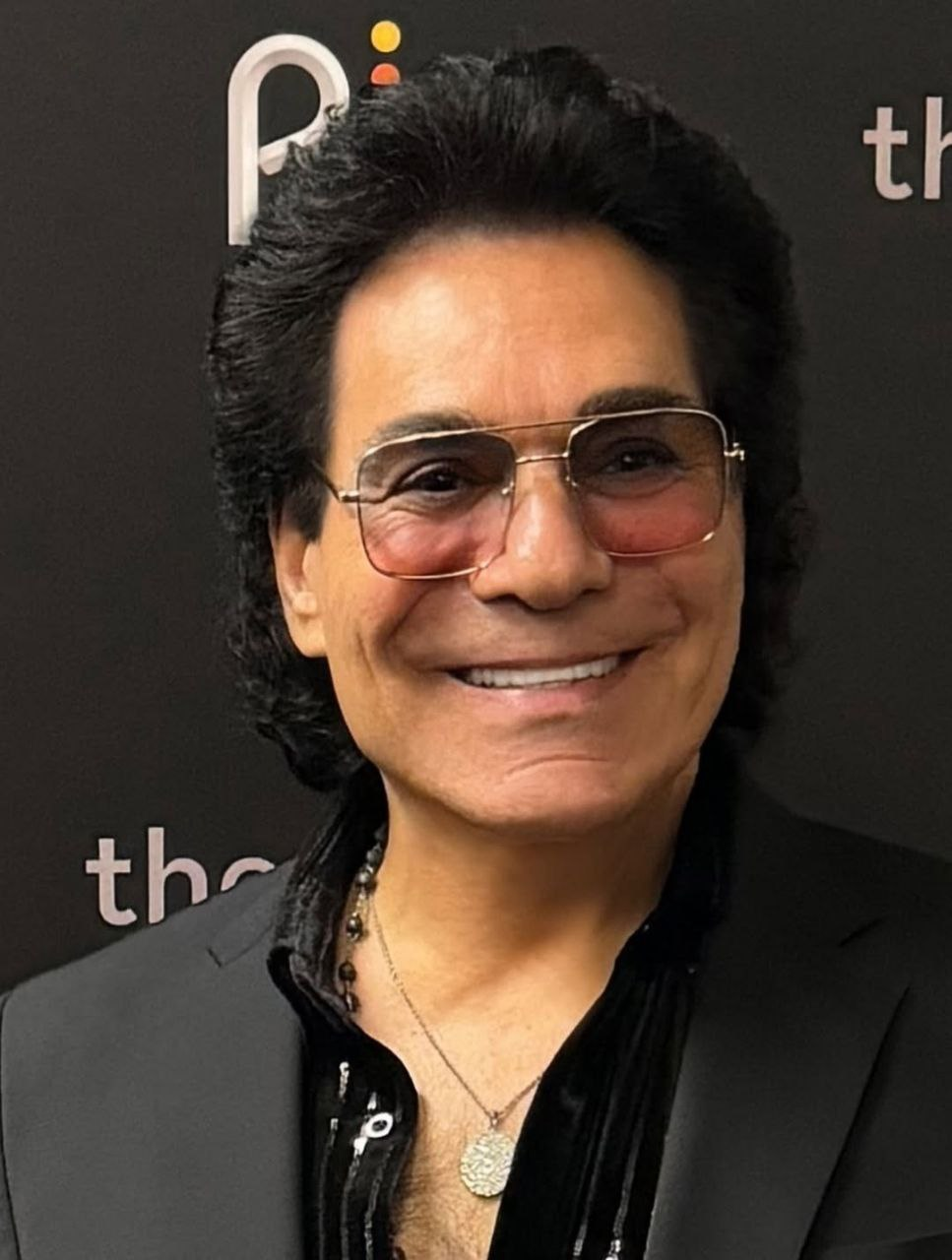
- Andy in 2025
- Born: Andranik Madadian; April 22, 1958 (age 68); Tehran, Iran
- Occupations: Singer; songwriter; actor
- Years active: 1977–present
- Musical career
- Genres: Pop; dance-pop; rock; soft rock
- Instruments: Guitar; bass guitar
- Labels: Pars Video; Caltex; Taraneh Records; Avang Music; Cherokee Music Group
- Website: andymusic.com

Andranik Madadian (Note: Persian: آندرانیک مددیان, romanized: Ândrânik Madadiân, Armenian: Անդրանիկ Մադադյան), better known by his stage name Andy (Note: اندی, Անդի), is an Iranian singer-songwriter and actor. He sings in several languages including Persian, Armenian and English.

== Early life ==
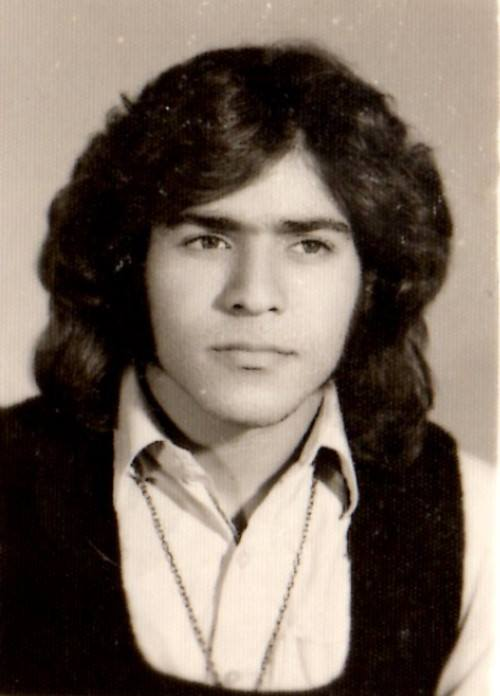
Undated photograph of Andy

Andy was born on April 22 1958 and in his childhood was in poverty, barely having running water and shared a single room with his family. Initially many in his family expected him to become an economist, he bought his first guitar when he was 14 years old. Following the Iranian Revolution in 1979, Andy fled the country and moved to the United States.

== Career ==
=== Duo in Andy and Kouros ===
Andy first gained recognition when he joined Kouros Shahmiri and they formed the duo Andy & Kouros, going on to release 4 albums together: Khastegary (1985), Parvaz (1987), the album Balla (1990), and Goodbye (1991). The two split in 1992, with both Andy and Kouros going on to have successful individual solo careers. The two reunited several times after that. In 2002 and 2004, they performed together for a sold-out audience in San Jose, California. In 2009, Andy & Kouros went on an international tour together in the Iranian diaspora, and performed together again in May 2010. They also appeared together on a music video by Farez, remaking their hit "Niloufar".

=== Solo career ===
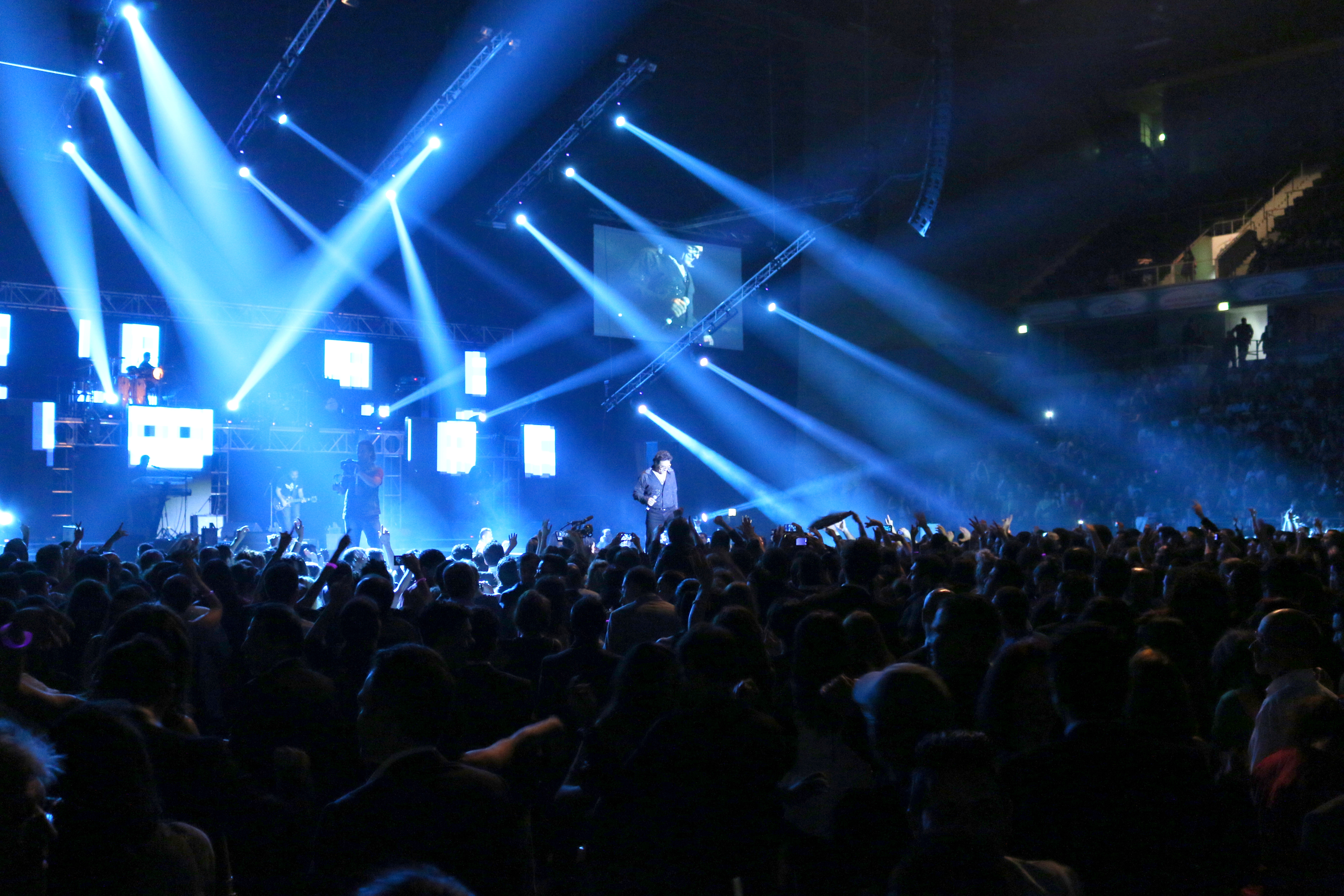
Andy in a Persian New Year Concert, Arena Oberhausen, March 2014

Andy has released 16 albums as a solo artist, one of his first was Beegharar which he realsed in 1992. His last three singles have ranked No. 1 in the charts. In 2013, Andy was nominated for Best Male Artist, Best Live Act, and Best Entertainer of the Year at the World Music Awards. The following year, he was presented with the "Millennium" award at the Big Apple Music Awards in New York City. On January 17, 2020, Andy was honored by the Hollywood Walk of Fame, with the 2,684th star.

=== Other collaborations ===
On June 24, 2009, Andy, Richie Sambora and Jon Bon Jovi recorded a version of the Leiber and Stoller standard Stand by Me, described by producer Don Was as a "worldwide solidarity with the people of Iran". The Persian introduction is done by both Andy and Jon Bon Jovi, and the rest of the song continues in English. The record was produced by Don Was and John Shanks and was registered at Henson Studio C, Hollywood, Los Angeles, California. He participated in a prestigious recording session for World Peace One, which featured some of the world's most successful artists uniting to promote peace. In 2014, Cherokee Music Productions released the humanitarian single, We Hear Your Voice which brought together 15 international stars from 11 countries to inspire fans and followers to find common ground and heal the divide between nations.

In March 2016, Andy released a duet with La Toya Jackson called "Tehran".

In April 2019, Andy released a duet with Algerian singer Khaled called "Salama So Good".

== Personal life ==
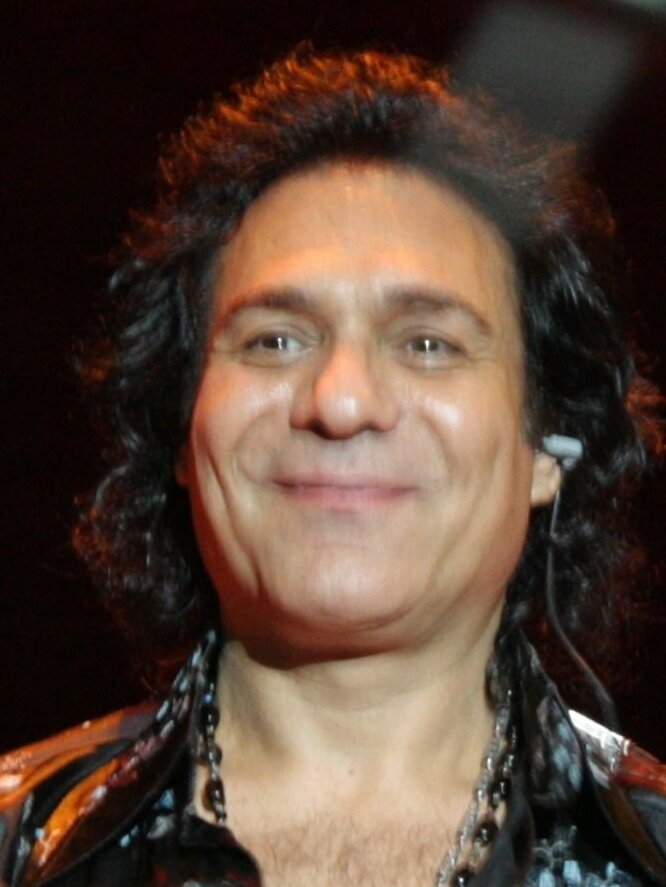
Andy in DC, January 2009

Andy married his longtime girlfriend and artist Shani Rigsbee on November 11, 2011. Around 1992, the couple began working and touring together. Soon after, they discovered Shani had ovarian cancer, and she had an early hysterectomy in 1992. The couple is associated with cancer-related charities and has performed together for the American Cancer Society's Relay for Life.

== Awards and honors ==
On January 17, 2020, Madadian was awarded the 2,684th star on the Hollywood Walk of Fame, becoming the first Iranian to receive the honor. His star is located at Highland Avenue at 6810 Hollywood Boulevard in Los Angeles.

- Best International Album, Armenian Music Awards (2004)
- Best International Album, Armenian Music Awards (2006)

== Discography ==
=== Studio Albums ===
==== Andy & Kouros ====
Title	Year	Notable tracks
Khastegary	1985	• Madar • Three of Us
Parvaz	1987	• Topoli • Ma Hame Irooni Hastim • Niloufar
Balla	1990	• Balla • Sheytoon Bala • Negah • Leila • Khodaye Asemoonha
Goodbye	1991	• Atish Pareh • Yasaman • Ameneh

==== Andy ====
Title	Year	Notable tracks	Album details
Future's Feature	1977	• Eshgh o Issar • Walkin' in the Rain • Today's Just Like Tomorrow	
Beegharar	1992	• Dokhtar Irooni • Sheytanat • Beegharar • Entezar	First solo album following his split of duo with Kouros
Tanhaee	1994	• Naaze Naaz • Tanhaee • Cheshmaye Naaz	
Devoted	1996	• Dokhtare Bandar • Ghesseye Eshgh • Sarsepordeh • Tavalod	
Silk Road	1998	• Be Kasi Nagoo • Az Khod Gozashteh • Orere Seero • Melli Poosha	
And My Heart...	2000	• Yalla • Rayhan	Solo album. An international version was released in 2001 including 7 songs in Persian, 3 in English, 3 in Armenian, 2 in Spanish, 1 in Arabic, and 1 in Hindi. A cover of Hotel California by the Eagles is included in the later version.
Khalvate Man	2002	• Che Khoshgel Shodi • Shaghayegh	Solo album, including an Armenian version of "Topoli", a Spanish version of "Yalla", and 4 remixes of "Rayhan"
Orere Seero	2003	• Orere Seero • Garoun Garouneh	First all-Armenian solo album
Platinum	2004	• Areh Areh • Aroosak • Salame Asheghouneh	Solo album. "Salame Asheghoone" and "Sahraei", written by Leila Kasra, are featured in the 2003 film House of Sand and Fog.
City of Angels	2006	• Khoshgela Bayad Beraghsand • Mohem Naboud • Gole Bandar • Daram Miram Beh Tehran	Solo album, including 11 original songs and 5 remixes. A cover of "Marde Tanha" by Farhad and a remix by Nami are included. A new version of "Tanine Solh" written by Leila Kasra and originally performed by Andy, Kouros, Fataneh, Moein, and Morteza is included. "Daram Miram Beh Tehran" is featured as the soundtrack of the animated film "Babak & Friends: A First Norooz".
Airport	2007	• Faghat Yeh Negah • Bee To • Salam (featuring Khaled and Hakim) • Zamouneh	Solo album, including 13 original songs and 3 remixes

=== Singles and Collaborative Albums ===
Title	Year	Notes
Laili	1993	Collaborative album with Bijan Mortazavi and Hassan Shamaizadeh
Ghahremanane Vatan	1998	Single, collaboration with Leila Forouhar and Dariush
Nune	1999	Two-track single including a cover of "Chera Ashegh Shodam"
Yaran	2001	Collaborative album with Paksima, Pyruz, and Hamid Nadiri
Stand by Me	2009	With Richie Sambora and Jon Bon Jovi
We Hear Your Voice	2014	Humanitarian track and collaboration with 15 other artists
Far and Away	2014	"Guardian Angel" motion picture soundtrack featuring Shani
Parya khanoom	2015	Humanitarian track and collaboration with 15 other artists
Tehran	2016	Duet with La Toya Jackson
Salama So Good	2019	Duet with Algerian singer Khaled

== Filmography ==
Year	Title	Role
2003	Irangeles	Andy
2003	House of Sand and Fog	Wedding Singer
2005	The Keeper: The Legend of Omar Khayyam	Ali Ben-Sabbah
2005	Our Yard 3 (Armenian: Մեր Բակը 3)	Cameo
2010	Lost Journey: Lost Journey	Mr.Zand
2013	Shirin in Love	Andy

== Sources ==
- Tehran Magazine. Choose the Best: Andy, Mansour, or Shahram Kashani Issue 476. Page 72-76
