= Sami Beigi =

Iranian singer (born 1982)

Sami Beigi سامی بیگی
- Also known as: Sami Beigi
- Born: Saman Es'hagh Beigi; November 23, 1982 (age 43); Tehran, Iran
- Occupations: singer, songwriter
- Years active: 2008–present
- Labels: Caltex Record, Ecstatic Music Arts EMA, Avang, Radio Javan, King Record, Sb

Saman Es'hagh Beigi (Persian: سامان اسحاق‌بیگی. Born November 22, 1982), known as Sami Beigi (Persian: سامی بیگی), is an Iranian singer and songwriter currently living in Irvine, California, United States.

In an interview with "Zarebin" and "Voice of Farsi", he mentioned that he was raised in Sweden. Beigi attended music school in which he learned to play many different instruments, began to write and to produce music. His main instrument is the guitar.

He is a former member of the Persian Black Cats band and with Dear Friend Eddie Atttar gained recognition with the song he wrote for Black Cats, entitled "Yeki Bood Yeki Nabood."

With the emergence of King Records, RadioJavan severed ties with Aang music. The music video that RadioJavan plays was the “Mobham“ music video for "Black Cats " by Aang Music, after Sami Beigi claimed the song “ADVIL“was stolen from him.

Two years later, he left the band and started his solo career as a singer and songwriter. He made many successful singles, among which "In Eshghe", "Ey Joonam", and "HMG", are some of the most popular ones. His single "Kaghaz va Ghalam", debuted on February 28 of 2014 and received more than 700,000 replays on RadioJavan website in only four days.

Sami Beigi is in tv show for Persian's Nowrouz 1391 special TV program Manoto singer.

Sami Beigi is featured in BBC Persian's Nowrouz 1393 special TV program. He performed three of his singles "Ey joonam", "HMG", and "Kaghaz & Ghalam", and in the interview he states that it took him about two to three years to finish writing "Kaghaz & Ghalam". In another interview with "Voice of Farsi", he states that although he has been writing songs and singing since the age of 15 years, he never thought he could launch a successful solo career.

== Albums ==
2008 : Dimbolgy in with (Black cats)

2018 : Padeshah

2024 : EX
