= Mina Assadi =

Iranian-born poet, author, journalist and songwriter

- مینا اسدی
- Born: 12 March 1943 (age 83); Sari, Iran
- Citizenship: Iranian, Swedish
- Occupation: Poet

Mina Assadi (Persian: مینا اسدی; born 12 March 1943) is an Iranian-born poet, author, journalist and songwriter who lives in exile in Stockholm, Sweden.

== Author ==
Assadi wrote her debut book, a collection of poems named Minas Gift (Armanghane Mina), at the age of 18. Thereafter she worked as a journalist for several well-known Iranian magazines, for example, Kayhan. She has written 14 books in total, the book Who Throws Rocks (Che kasi sang miandazad) attracting the most attention.

She is known for writing about controversial and provocative subjects, especially when she describes the fight against the Iranian government. In 2007 she wrote the poem called "Pimps" (Djakesha). It caused a lot of discussion for being too vulgar. The poem is about those who live in Iran and in exile who have forgotten the struggle.

== Songwriter ==
Assadi has also written songs for Iranian singers like Ebi ("Halah"), Dariush ("Zendegi yek bazieh" and "Ahay javoon"), Hayedeh ("Onkeh yek roozi barayeh man khoda bod"), Giti ("Oje parvaz"), Ramesh ("To aftabi, to baroni") and Nooshafarin ("Koh he ghavei") and Afshin ("delam az ru nemire) to name a few.

== Reception ==
Ten days before the Iranian cultural personality and singer Fereydoun Farrokhzad was murdered in Germany on August 7, 1992, he had a poetry evening. The evening was interspersed with poems, songs and political statements. There, Fereydoun compared his late sister, the contemporary poet Forough Farrokhzad, to Assadi. A statement that was filmed and became the last video with Fereydoun before his death.

Assadi has been discussed alongside other prominent Iranian women poets such as Forough Farrokhzad, Simin Daneshvar, and Simin Behbahani. Her work has been compared to that of Persian poets including Simin Behbahani and Parvin E'tesami, as well as Swedish poets Karl Vennberg and Edith Södergran.

Assadi has also been compared to other Persian poets like Simin Behbahani and Parvin E'tesami and Swedish poets Karl Vennberg and Edith Södergran.

== Personal life ==
In 1996, she received a Hellman/Hammett Grant from Human Rights Watch of New York City, U.S.

== Sources ==
- R M Chopra, "Eminent Poetesses of Persian", Iran Society, Kolkata, 2010.
- "Mina Assadi is the Forough Farrokhzad of today"

== See also ==
- Forough Farrokhzad
- Fereydoun Farrokhzad
- Ebi
- Leila Kasra
- List of Iranian women
- Persian literature
