= Hasrate Parvaz =

Studio album by Ebi
- Released: 2006
- Genre: Pop
- Label: Avang Music

Ebi chronology
Shabe Niloufari (2003)	Hasrate Parvaz (2006)	Hesse Tanhaee (2011)

Hasrat-e Parvaz (Persian: حسرت پرواز, lit. 'Begrudging Flight'), is a studio album by Iranian singer Ebi, released in 2006.

== Track listing ==
No.	Title	Writer(s)	Length
1.	"Sedam Kardi"	Iraj Janatie Ataie	4:29
2.	"Vaghti to Nisti"	Iraj Janatie Ataie	4:09
3.	"Hanaa Khanoom"	Zoya Zakarian	3:48
4.	"Begoo Aare, Begoo Na"	Iraj Janatie Ataie	3:58
5.	"Parvaanehi Dar Mosht"	Iraj Janatie Ataie	3:30
6.	"Baanooye Khaavari"	Zoya Zakarian	5:40
7.	"Harighe Sabz"	Zoya Zakarian	3:49
8.	"Man Agar Khoda Boodam"	Zoya Zakarian	5:55

"Harighe Sabz" (2006)
A 29-second preview of Ebi's "Harighe Sabz". The song is a Pop, from Hasrate Parvaz album.
