= Tasmim =

Single by Ebi

from the album Hesse Tanhaee
- Released: 2009
- Genre: Pop
- Length: 3:59
- Label: Avang Music
- Songwriter: Ariana

Ebi singles chronology
"Tasmim" (2009)	"Navazesh" (2010)

Tasmim (Persian: تصمیم) (English: Decision), is the critical single by Iranian singer, Ebi, released in 2009, just a few months before the controversial 2009 presidential election. Iranian regime election and Iranian Revolution

== Lyrics ==
In a part of his Tasmim, Ebi critics the election system of the Islamic Republic:

If they talked about freedom, be aware that's just a sea in mirage, what's the electoral right between bad and worse?
