= Khalij (album) =

Studio album by Ebi
- Released: 1990
- Genre: Pop
- Label: Taraneh Records

Ebi chronology
Kouhe Yakh (1987)	Khalij (1990)	Gharibeh (1991)

Singles from Khalij
- 1. "Persian Gulf Forever" Released: 1990

Khalij (Persian: خلیج, romanized: Khalīj, lit. 'lit.The Gulf'), or Khalij-e Fars (Persian: خلیج فارس, romanized: Khalīj-e Fārs, lit. 'Persian Gulf'), is a studio album by Iranian singer, Ebi, released in 1990 on the label of Taraneh Records.

== Track listing ==
No.	Title	Writer(s)	Length
1.	"Persian Gulf Forever"	Adel Hasani	4:26
2.	"Goriz"	Ardalan Sarfaraz	3:16
3.	"Medad Rangi"	Bijan Samandar	3:39
4.	"Khanom Gol"	Ardalan Sarfaraz	4:25
5.	"Hezaro Yek Shab"	Ardalan Sarfaraz	4:37
6.	"Hamdam"	Ardalan Sarfaraz	3:20
7.	"Delbar"	Ardalan Sarfaraz	3:52
8.	"Kolbee Man"	Leila Kasra	3:36
9.	"Dorahi"	Homa Houmayon	5:57
10.	"Shekar"	Mohammad Ali Shirazi	4:39
