= Hesse Tanhaee =

Studio album by Ebi
- Released: March 17, 2011
- Recorded: 2005–January 21, 2011
- Genre: Pop
- Length: 44:03
- Label: Avang Music
- Producers: Armin Hashemi (exec.); Mahin Abadani (exec.); Farshid Rafe Rafahi (exec.); Mahshid Hamedi Boromand (exec.); Yasmine Ash; Navíd Akhavan

Ebi chronology
| Hasrate Parvaz (2006) | Hesse Tanhaee (2011) | Jane Javani (2014) |

Singles from Hesse Tanhaee
- 1. "Tasmim" Released: 2009; 2. "Navazesh" Released: 7 October 2010; 3. "Khoda Ba Maast" Released: 6 March 2011; 4. "Aasheghane" Released: 25 March 2011; 5. "Ye Roozi" Released: 19 November 2011; 6. "Hesse Tanhaee" Released: 15 February 2012

Hess-e Tanhaee (Persian: حس تنهایی, romanized: The Feeling of Loneliness) is the twentieth studio album by Iranian singer, Ebi, released by Avang Music on March 18, 2011, and for online streaming worldwide on iTunes and Amazon Music a day earlier. Three singles were made available prior to the album's release, "Tasmim" in 2009, "Navazesh" on 7 October 2010, and "Khoda Ba Maast" on 6 March 2011. An additional three singles were later released, "Aasheghane" on 25 March, 11, "Ye Roozi" on 19 November 2011, and "Hesse Tanhaee" on 15 February 2012.

Ebi worked with his wife, Mahshid Hamedi Boromand, and producers Farshid Rafe Rafahi, Armin Hashemi, Mahin Abadani, Yasmine Asha and Navíd Akhavan on the album.

== Production ==
The album's production began in 2005, Ebi worked with prominent composers in Persian music such as Andranik Assatourian, Schubert Avakian, Shadmehr Aghili, and Babak Bayat. Bayat died in 2006, one year after production began.

== Release and promotion ==
Hesse Tanhaee was released worldwide on 18 March 2011. The album was made available for digital downloading on the iTunes Store and on Amazon Music a day earlier. Shipping and sales were sponsored by EMH Productions, however, delivery to Iran was unavailable.

Production concluded on January 21, 2011, and the album was set to be released by Avang Music the next month. However, its release was delayed until March.

=== Singles ===
"Tasmim" was chosen as the lead single for the album; it was released in 2009, just a few months before the controversial 2009 presidential election. Music and arrangement was carried out by Schubert Avakian, and lyrics were written by Ariana. The accompanying music video was directed by Denis Peters, and contains scenes of Ebi singing whilst in line for food; at the end of the video the camera pans to the chef and then to two bowls filled with worms and insects.

"Navazesh" was released as the second single on 7 October 2010. The music was composed by Shadmehr Aghili, and arranged by Andranik; the lyrics were written by Soroush Dadkhah. The accompanying music video was directed by Ali Zamani and Alex Ferra, and produced by Zeus Zamani. The video contains scenes of Ebi singing in an arid setting with frequent shots of a couple appearing. By the end of the video, the remains of a plane from a plane crash are shown, with the couple fading away implying that they had died in the accident. The video ends with a scene of a young girl watering a flowering plant at the now cleared crash sight, before walking away.

"Khoda Ba Maast" was chosen to be the third single off the album, it was released on 6 March 2011. Music and arrangement was carried out by Schubert Avakian, and lyrics were written by Afshin Moghadam. The accompanying music video was directed by Alec Cartio.

"Aasheghane" was released as the fourth single on 25 March 2011. The music was composed by Babak Bayat, and arranged by Shahram Azar; the lyrics were written by Ahoora Iman. The accompanying music video was directed by Navid Akhavan and Yasmine Ghassemi.

"Ye Roozi" was released as the fifth single on 19 November 2011. Music and arrangement was carried out by Schubert Avakian, and lyrics were written by Pooyan Moghaddassi. The accompanying music video was directed by Navid Akhavan.

"Hesse Tanhaee", the title track of the album, was released as the sixth and final single off the album, it was released on 15 February 2012. Music and arrangement was carried out by Schubert Avakian, and lyrics were written by Babak Roozbeh. The accompanying music video was directed by Ravi.

== Track listing ==
- The track listing is adapted from Amazon Music.

| No. | Title | Writer(s) | Length |
|---|---|---|---|
| 1. | "Ye Ashegh" | Babak Roozbeh | 4:44 |
| 2. | "Hesse Tanhaee" | Babak Roozbeh | 3:16 |
| 3. | "Badbin" | Mona Borzouei | 3:39 |
| 4. | "Asheghane" | Ahoora Iman | 4:25 |
| 5. | "Khoda ba Maast" | Afshin Moghaddam | 4:37 |
| 6. | "Ye Roozi" | Pooyan Moghaddassi | 3:19 |
| 7. | "Navazesh" | Soroush Dadkhah | 3:52 |
| 8. | "Boghz O Baroon" | Babak Roozbeh | 3:36 |
| 9. | "Pelk" | Afshin Moghaddam | 3:57 |
| 10. | "Jahanbini" | Mahyar Kazemzadeh | 4:39 |
| 11. | "Tasmim" | Ariana | 3:59 |

"Badbin"
A 30-second sample of "Badbin", written by Iranian lyricist and poet Mona Borzouee, the lyrics are emotional and romantic in nature.
