= Mohsen Ebrahimzadeh =

Iranian pop singer (born 1987)

Mohsen Ebrahimzadeh محسن ابراهیم‌زاده
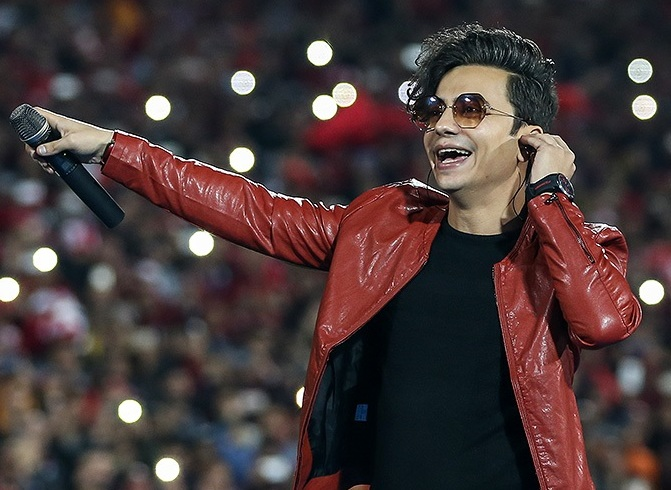
- Ebrahimzadeh performing at the 2018 AFC Champions League final

Background information
- Born: 8 September 1987 (age 38); Tehran, Iran
- Genres: Persian Pop; Persian traditional music
- Occupations: Singer; Songwriter; Arrangement; Composer; Dancer
- Instruments: Vocals; Guitar; santur; ney
- Years active: 2012–present
- Website: t.me/MohsenEbrahimzadehmusicofficiaI

Mohsen Ebrahimzadeh (Persian: محسن ابراهیم‌زاده; born 8 September 1987, in Tehran) is an Iranian pop singer and musician. He performed at the 2018 AFC Champions League final between Persepolis and Kashima Antlers at Azadi Stadium.

His biggest hit, Doneh Doneh has 17 million views on YouTube.

== Discography ==
=== Singles ===
- 01: Boye Eyd
- 02: Mamnoe
- 03: Dooset Daram (ft. mostafa momeni)
- 04: Bi Andaze
- 05: Khahesh
- 06: Nagoo Na
- 07: Bi Vafa
- 08: Tanhaei
- 09: Ki Midoneh?
- 10: Bargard
- 11: Hava Khah
- 12: Mano Deltangi
- 13: Khodahafez
- 14: Bandar
- 15: Hagh Dari
- 16: Arom Arom
- 17: Midoni
- 18: 72 Sardar
- 19: Shahe Mani
- 20: Eshghe sarerahi
- 21: Eshghe Man (ft. Ali Abbasi)
- 22: Nisti
- 23: Donya Male Mane
- 24: Tab
- 25: az sare adat
- 24: gelaye
- 25: to bego
- 26: Ashob
- 27: Dele mo
- 28: Arbabe Asheghi
- 39: Tamom kon bro
- 30: Bazam Barf
- 31: Cheghadr Zood
- 32: Mage Darim
- 33: Ghahreman Bi Edeaa
- 34: Boye Baroon
- 35: Ta Abad
- 36: Kare Dele
- 37: Dorehami
- 38: Sale No
- 39: Tavalodet
- 40: Emshab
- 41: Azize Ki Boodi
- 42: Bardasht Raft
- 43: Kojaei
- 44: Shab Gardi
- 45: Ghalaf
- 46: Paye Sabetam
- 47: Shabhaye Divonegi
- 48: Darde Del
- 49: In Del Raft
- 50: Bahoone Pore
- 51: Chi Shod
- 52: Timar
- 53: Mishi Fadash
- 54: Marhame Jan
- 55: Gerdab
- 56: To YARE Mani
- 57: Doneh Doneh
