= Kouros Shahmiri =

Persian singer

Kouros Shahmiri کوروس شاهمیری
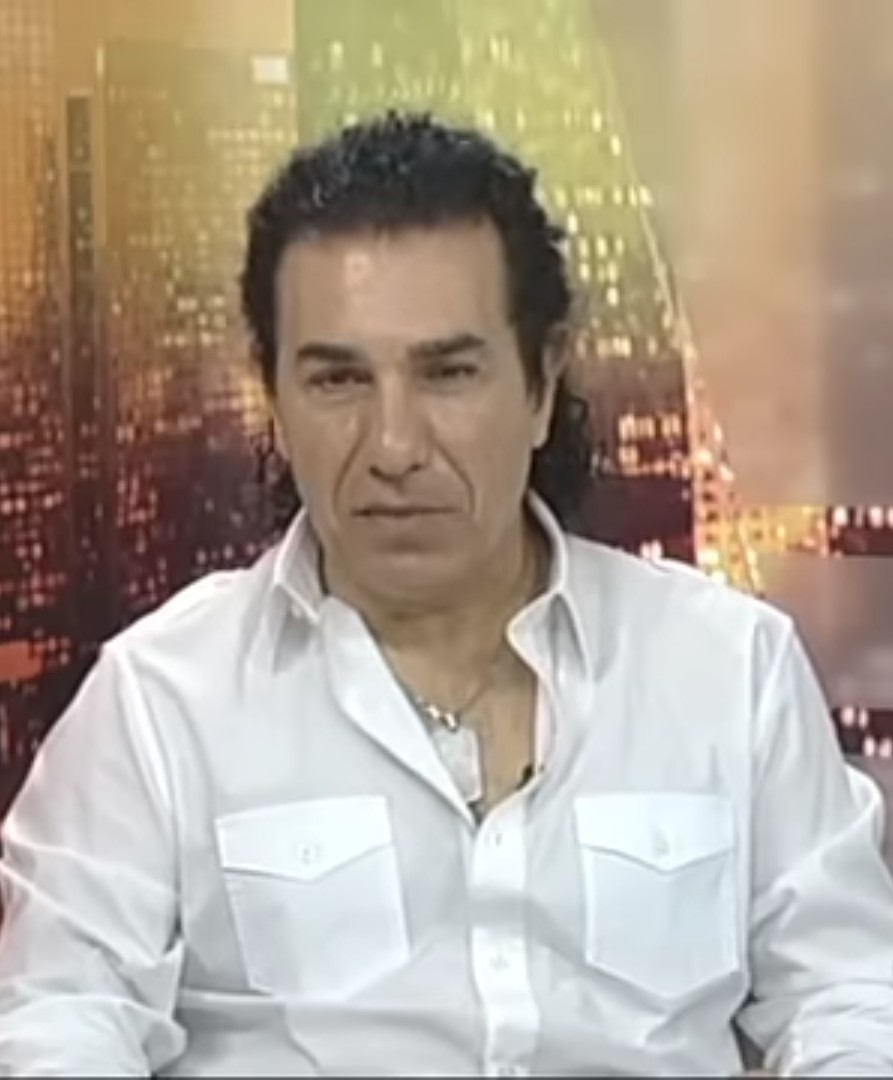
- Korous in an interview

Background information
- Also known as: کوروس
- Born: March 21, 1953 (age 73); Tehran, Imperial State of Iran
- Genres: Pop, dance-pop, rock, soft rock
- Occupations: Singer, songwriter
- Years active: 1985–present

Kouros Shahmiri (Persian: کوروس شاهمیری), also known by the mononym "Kouros" (Persian: کوروس), is an Iranian–American pop singer, best known for being part of the pop duo Andy & Kouros with Andranik Madadian (Andy).

Andy and Kouros released four albums together: Khastegary (1985), Parvaz (1988), the hugely successful album Balla, and finally Goodbye (1991). The two split in 1992, with both Andy and Kouros going on to have successful individual solo careers.

After the split, Kouros has released a number of solo albums.

Andy and Kouros reunited several times after that point. In 2002 and 2004 they performed together for a sold-out audience in San Jose, California. In 2009, Andy & Kouros they went on an international tour together in the Iranian diaspora, and performed together again in May, 2010. They also appeared together on a music video by Farez remaking their hit "Niloufar".

== Discography ==
=== Albums ===
as Andy & Kouros

- 1985: Khastegary (خواستگاری)
  - Notable tracks "Three of Us" / "Madar"
- 1987: Parvaz (پرواز)
  - Notable tracks: "Chi Mishod", "Restless", "Niloufar", "Topoli", "Restless"
- 1990: Balla (بلا)
  - Notable tracks: "Balla", "Leila", "Negah", "Sheytoon Balla", "Khodaye Asemoonha", "Don't Go Away"
- 1991: Goodbye (خداحافظ)
  - Notable tracks: "Strange Love", "Yasaman"

Solo

- 1992: نسل من
- 1995: یاغی
- 1998: دروازهٔ عشق
- 2000: عاشق‌ترین
- 2010: افسانه
- 2026: October 10, 2025 (usage of AI is present in the music video)
