= Afshin Yadollahi =

Iranian psychiatrist

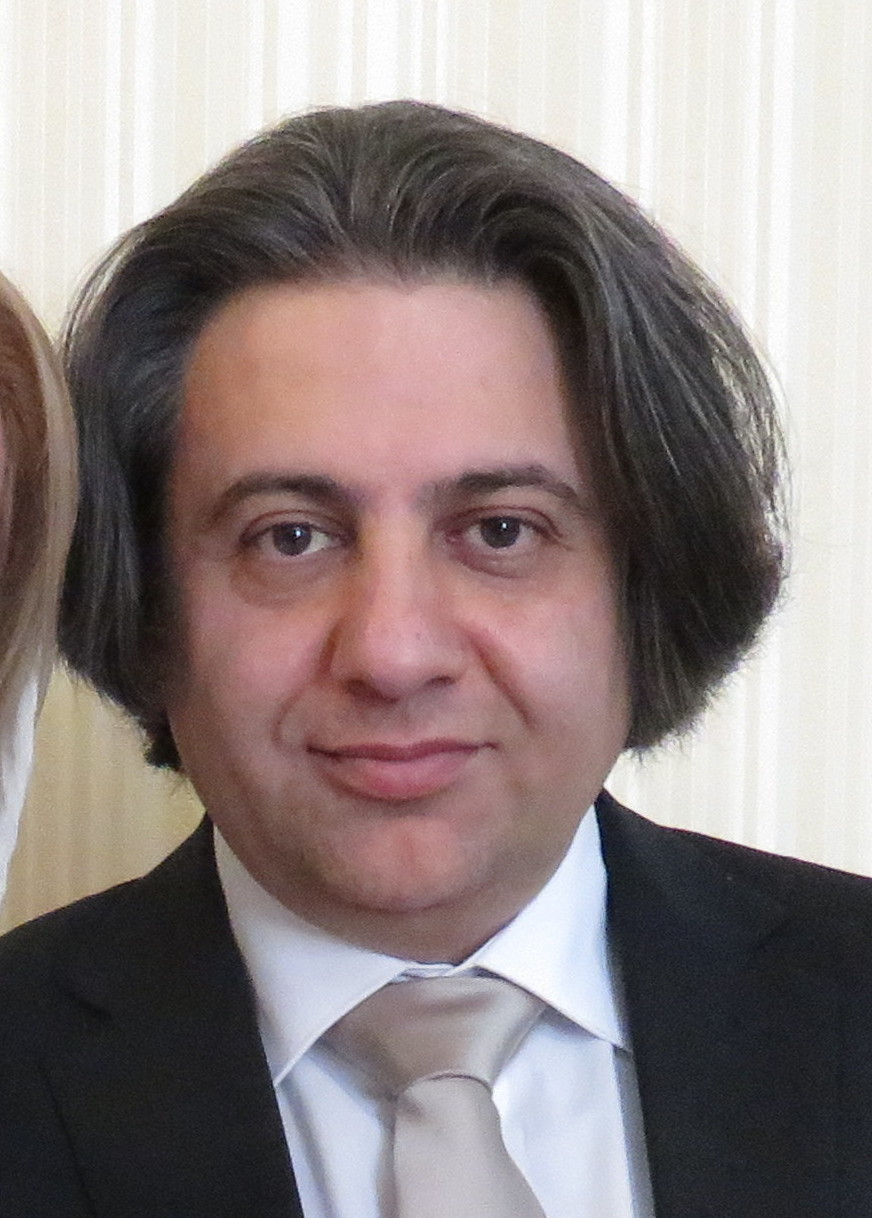
- Yadollahi in 2015
- Born: 11 January 1969; Esfahan, Iran
- Died: 16 March 2017 (aged 48)
- Occupations: psychiatrist; songwriter

Afshin Yadollahi (11 January 1969 – 16 March 2017) was an Iranian songwriter and psychiatrist.

== Career ==
He started his professional songwriting activities in 1997 in the Radio and Television Organization. His first songs were composed by Fouad Hejazi and Shadmehr Aghili and sung by Khashayar Etemadi, Including "From Persia to the Caspian Sea", which was composed by Shadmehr Aghili.

=== TV series credits ===
Yadollahi wrote songs for the credits of many television series, including Sunny Night, A Traveler from India, Khoshrkab, Just for You, Help Me, Strange Series, Tenth Night, Line Breaker, Forbidden Fruit, Zero Degree Orbit, Tabriz in the Fog and The Enigma of the Shah.

=== Song House ===
For several years, Yadollahi was the director of an association called the Song House. The Song House was established in 2001 with the collaboration of songwriters such as Abbas Sajjadi, Saeed Amir Aslani, Babak Sahraei, Yaghma Golroei, Afshin Siahpoosh, Niloufar Laripour, Mohammad Reza Habibi and Afshin Yadollahi. These sessions were devoted to songwriting, song critique, and workshop sessions. The meetings of the Song House were then transferred to the Cultural Center of Law and then to the Cultural Center of Shafaq and the Cultural Center of Arasbaran.

Over the years, the songs of the founders of the Song House gradually separated from it for various reasons, and Afshin Yadollahi was the only surviving member of the founding board of the association, who continued to run the Song House after this incident. The meetings of the Song House at the Shafaq Cultural Center were among the least effective executive meetings. The location of the Song House has changed over time.

Old songwriters in the Song House can be named: Akbar Ahmadi, Nader Bakhtiari, Mona Borzoi, Sanaz Safaei, Alireza Soleimani, Roozbeh Bomani, Mehdi Ayoubi, Siamak Rajavar, Foroueh Vazm, Bamdad Bamdad, Kourosh Samiei, Saeed Karimi, Saber Ghadimi, Sajjad Mirzakhani, Misagh Johari, Vahid Arabani, Mahsa Samavati, Elmira Aghazadeh, Nima Koklani, Meysam Yousefi and many other old members of the association were mentioned.
