= Naser Abdollahi =

Iranian singer and composer (1970–2006)

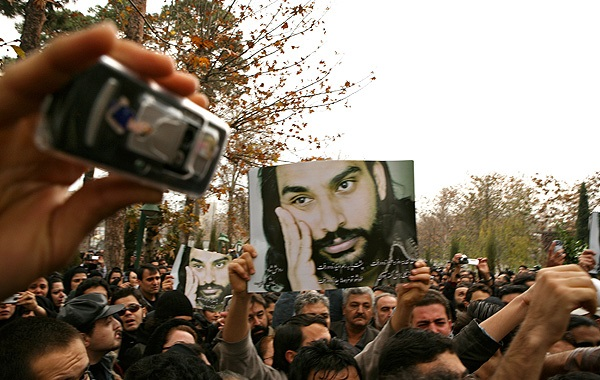
Funeral of Nasser Abdullahi

Nasser Abdollahi (1970–2006) was an Iranian singer, composer, arranger, musician, and songwriter who first rose to fame with the song "Nasseria".

His father, Abdolrahman Abdollahi, was a retired worker, and his mother, Mehrnegar Bandari, is a housewife. He became interested in music at the age of 13. He began his artistic activities in his teenage years at the Iranian Radio and Television and the artistic circle of the Islamic Propaganda Organization of Hormozgan Province. At the age of 18, Nasser married Fahimeh Ghafouri from Bandar Abbas, who is three years older than him, and they have three children (two sons and a daughter), named Navid, Nazanin, and Nami. Nina is Nasser's fourth child, the result of his marriage to Fatemeh Fahimi. Abdollahi began his professional career seriously in 1995. In 1997, he moved to Tehran with his wife.

== Albums ==
Nasser has released albums such as:

"Hekam Ta'at", "Ganugh" (Ganugh in the Bandar Abbasi dialect means: crazy), "Shahid Nasser", "Mohammad Jan", "Dar Pey God", "Sabuh Al Quds", "Eidana", "Eshgh Est" (with Parviz Parastoi and Mohammad Ali Bahmani), "Doost Daram" (with Parviz Parastoi), "Boy Sharji", "Hawai Hava", "Mandegar", "Rahsat" (with Parviz Parastoi).
