= Pyruz =

Iranian singer (born 1962)

Pyruz پیروز
- Also known as: Pyruz
- Born: Pyruz Payandeh Azad; April 5, 1962 (age 64); Tehran, Iran
- Genres: Pop; R&B; Dance
- Occupations: Singer songwriter composer
- Years active: 1992–present
- Labels: Caltex Records; Avang Records; Taraneh Records; MZM Records
- Website: pyruzmusic.com

Pyruz Payandeh Azad (Persian: پیروز پاینده آزاد, born April 5, 1962 in Tehran) is a Persian pop singer, songwriter, guitarist, and former member of the group Black Cats.

== Discography ==
Albums With Black Cats

- 1992: Pool
- 1993: Fever
- 1996: Spell of the Cats

Solo Albums

- 2000: New Love
- 2001: Pendar-E-Neek
- 2004: A Better Tomorrow
- 2012: Always
