= Aref (singer) =

Iranian pop music singer and actor (1941–2026)

Aref عارف
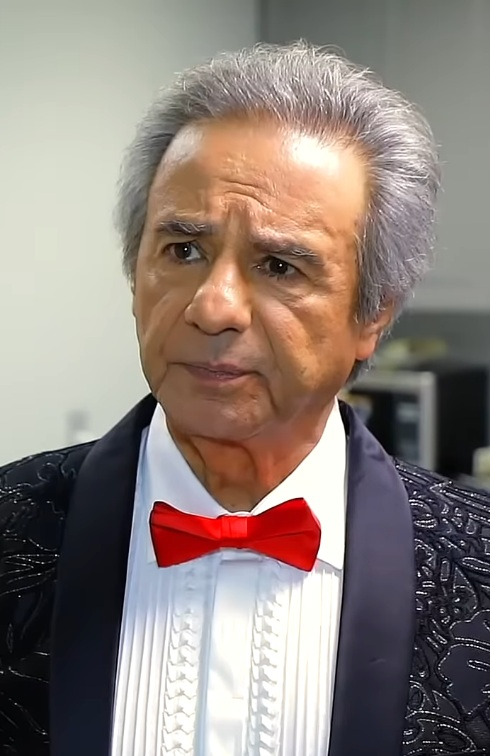
- Aref in 2019

Background information
- Born: Aref Arefkia; 10 August 1940; Tehran, Imperial State of Iran
- Died: 20 March 2026 (aged 85)
- Occupations: Singer, actor
- Years active: 1963–2026
- Website: arefrecords.com

Aref Arefkia (Persian: عارف عارف‌کیا; 10 August 1941 – 20 March 2026), known by the mononym Aref (عارف; also romanized as Āref), was an Iranian pop music singer and actor.

Aref Arefkia died on 20 March 2026, at the age of 85.
