= Dariush (singer) =

Iranian singer (born 1951)

Dariush داریوش
- Dariush, pre-revolution

Background information
- Born: Dariush Eghbali; 4 February 1951 (age 75); Tehran, Iran
- Genres: Persian pop, rock
- Occupation: Singer
- Years active: 1970–present
- Website: dariush2000.com

Dariush Eghbali (Persian: داریوش اقبالی, born 4 February 1951), known mononymously as Dariush (داریوش), is an Iranian singer. He began his music career in the early 1970s, even earning the title of Iran's most popular singer from a 1977 youth magazine. Ethnomusicology Professor Farzaneh Hemmasi has described Dariush as "the best-loved popular musician of his generation" alongside Googoosh. He left Iran after the 1979 Iranian Revolution, but continues to release music. His work consists of over 208 songs in over 27 albums, as well as roles in 2 Iranian films: Yaran and Faryad Zir e Ab.

== Childhood and youth ==
Dariush was born in Tehran to parents from Mianeh on 4 February 1951. He spent his early years in Mianeh and Piranshahr (in East Azerbaijan and West Azerbaijan provinces, respectively), as well as Karaj and Kurdistan province. His musical talent was first recognized at age nine when he appeared on stage at his school.

== Career ==
=== Pre-revolution success ===
Dariush began his music career in 1970. Hassan Khayatbashi introduced him to the public at the age of 20 through Iranian national television. He gained popularity for his song "Don't Tell Me You Love Me" (Persian: به من نگو دوست دارم be man nagu duset dāram). His songs from this period were mostly classified as "ballads", with some music containing political themes. Dariush also worked with several famous Iranian pre-revolution songwriters.

In 1977, Dariush was named the most popular singer in Iran by a youth magazine.

==== Imprisonment ====
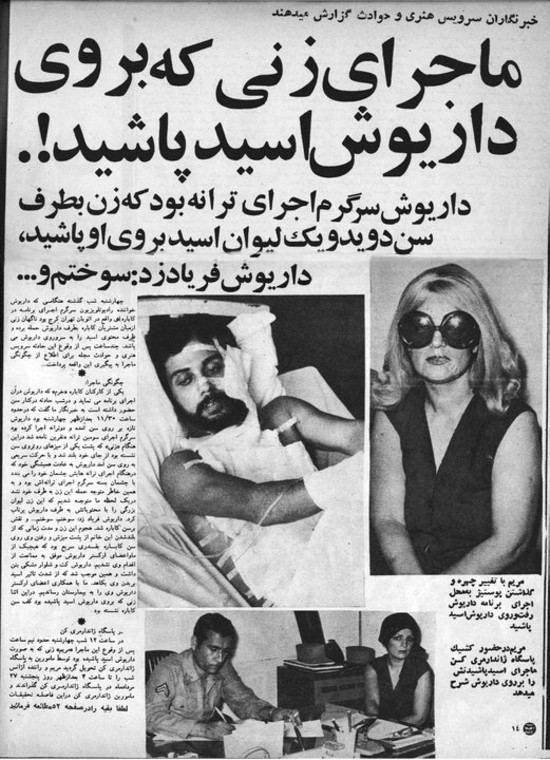
A Iranian magazine clipping discussing the acid attack on Dariush

Dariush was arrested and imprisoned for 26 months during the reign of Shah Mohammmad Reza Pahlavi.

==== Acid attack ====
In the late 1970s, Dariush was hospitalized after an acid attack by a "deranged" fan. As a result, he was treated with the drug morphine, which he later became addicted to, but eventually overcame the addiction and stopped taking the drug.

=== Post-Islamic revolution ===
After the Islamic Revolution, Dariush left Iran in 1981 and became a part of the diasporic music scene in Los Angeles. Dariush's 1991 song "Dastaye To (Your Hands)" was named the most enduring song in Iranian music history by Manoto TV. His new songs protested Iran's new political system, which caused his popularity to grow even more, making him one of the most well known Iranian singers. Also, while staying in Los Angeles, he supported all Iranians who were asylum seekers.

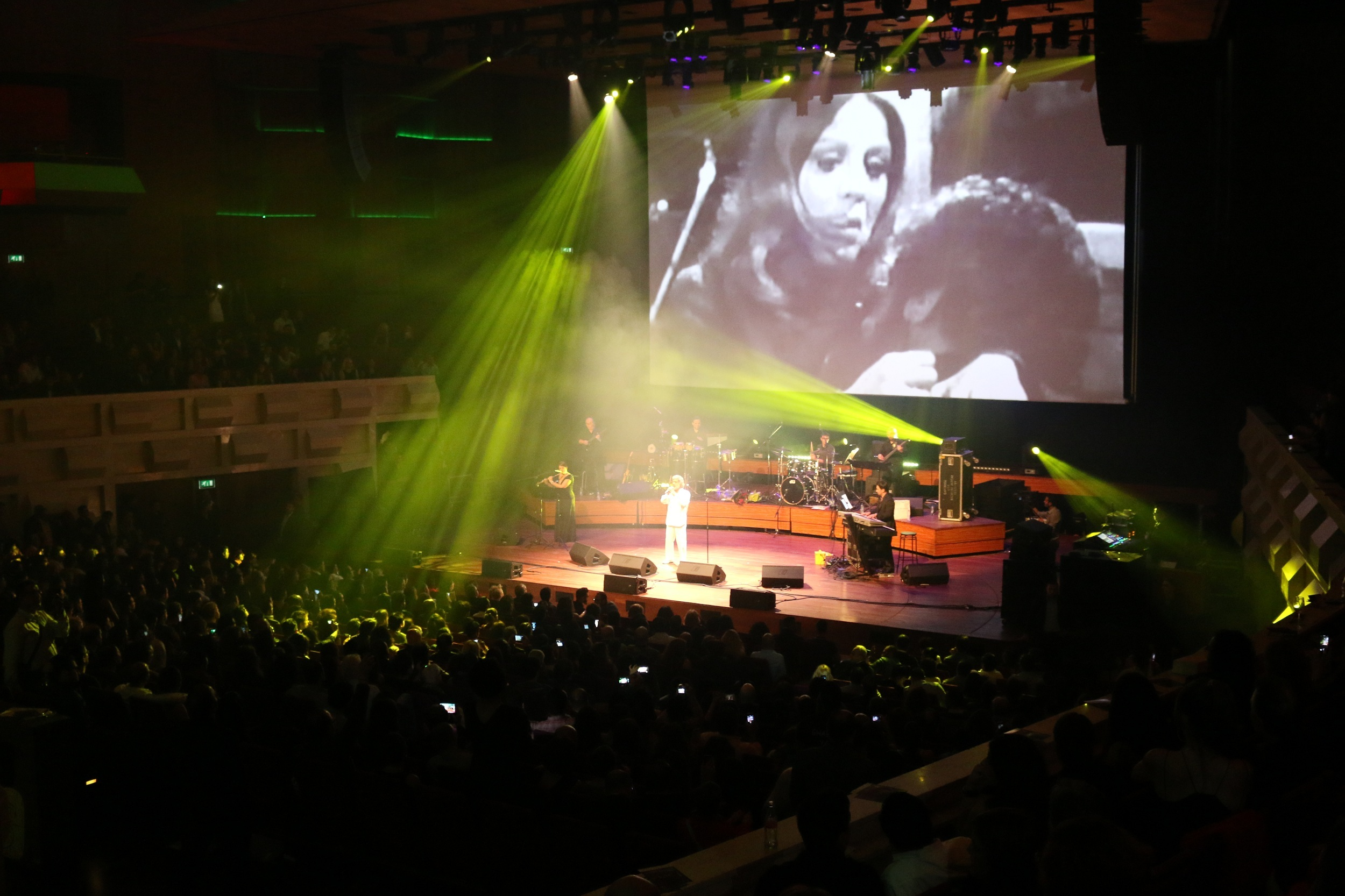
Dariush performing at De Doelen Concert Hall in 2014

==== 2022 bomb threat ====
In 2022, during Dariush's appearance at the Hammersmith Apollo concert venue in London, the venue was evacuated after a bomb threat was made by an anonymous caller. The Metropolitan Police released a statement saying that "there was nothing to indicate the threat made was genuine". Dariush responded to the incident in a video on his Instagram account, stating:

"So many are upset by Iranians' solidarity and unity and sympathy. They certainly don't like people singing together and they don't want such an event, especially when it is in London. We all know how important London is. I will be back and sing for my dear compatriots. I don't want to blame anybody. We learnt from what happened. Next time we know how to act so people inside Iran can hear us. Our people want solidarity and will be united."

== Philanthropy ==
Dariush in 1972

Dariush is a member of Amnesty International. Dariush helps Amnesty International by focusing efforts on Iranian asylum seekers and saving working children.

== Personal life ==
He is married to Venus Eghbali.

=== Addiction and recovery ===
Dariush struggled with heroin addiction ever since his first incarceration. In the year 2000, Dariush quit heroin and sang a song titled Silent Miracle (Persian: معجزه خاموش). The song references a turning point in his life and the overcoming of his addiction. Dariush launched his recovery site, ayeneh.org, (ayeneh translates to mirror in Persian) which marked history as the first-ever website to help Iranian addicts and their families. Then, he started his Ayeneh Foundation to help Iranian addicts. His foundation has reportedly assisted over 40,000 Iranians in breaking their substance abuse problems so far.

== Discography ==
=== Albums ===
- 1970: Be Man Nagoo Dooset Daram
- 1973: Cheshme Man
- 1976: Shaghayegh
- 1976: Saale Dohezar
- 1977: Faryad Zire Ab
- 1982: Nadim
- 1983: Parandeyeh Mohajer
- 1984: Emrooz
- 1986: Nazanin
- 1987: Khamoosh Namirid
- 1989: Khake Khasteh
- 1990: Noono Paniro Sabzi
- 1991: Be Man Nagoo Dooset Daram
- 1991: Zendouni
- 1991: Cheshme Man
- 1992: Aman Az
- 1995: Bachehaye Iran
- 1996: Ashofteh Bazaar
- 1997: Ahay Mardome Donya
- 1999: Jangal
- 2000: Gole Bita
- 2003: Rumi
- 2003: Dobareh Misazamat Vatan
- 2004: Raahe Man
- 2008: Mojezeye Khamoosh
- 2008: Salam Ey Khakeh Khoobe Mahrabani
- 2008: 40 Golden Hits of Dariush
- 2009: Khak-E-Khaste
- 2009: Derooz
- 2010: Donyaye in Roozaye
- 2016: Sefr
- 2021: Gorg
- 2023: The Essentials

== See also ==
- Farid Zoland
- Ebi
- Googoosh
- Iraj Janati Ataei
- Leila Kasra
- Mina Assadi
- Shahyar Ghanbari
- Viguen
