= Ebi =

Iranian pop singer (born 1949)

Ebi ابی
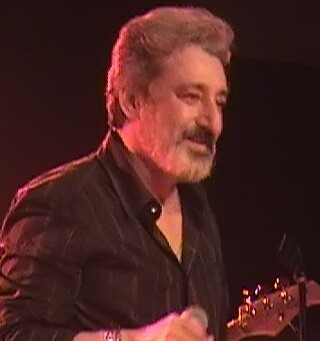
- Ebi in 2007

Background information
- Also known as: Ebi
- Born: Ebrahim Hamedi ابراهیم حامدی; 19 June 1949 (age 77); Tehran, Imperial State of Iran
- Genre: Persian pop music
- Years active: 1967–present
- Labels: Taraneh Records; Apolon Records; Caltex Records; Pars Video; Avang Records
- Spouse(s): Firouze Meghdadi (div.); Mahshid Boroumand
- Past members: Sun Boys; Black Cats (1967–1979)
- Website: t.me/EbiOfficialChannel ebihamedi.com

Ebrahim Hamedi (Persian: ابراهیم حامدی, romanized: Ebrāhim Hāmedi; born 19 June 1949), better known by his stage name Ebi (ابی), is an Iranian pop singer who first started his career in Tehran and Karaj, gaining fame as part of a band, and later as a solo performer. He moved to Los Angeles in 1977, two years before the 1979 revolution in Iran, and continued his career in exile. Over 50 years; Ebi has released nearly 200 singles and over 30 albums.

== Early life ==
Ebi's father was from Arak and his mother was from Karaj. He is the eldest of six siblings born in Khorramdareh.

In an interview with Radio Zamaneh in 2008, Ebi said that his hobby was singing and he sang to people at home, schoolmates and children in his neighborhood. He also stated that he began his singing skills by reciting the Quran via singing in his youth.

== Career ==
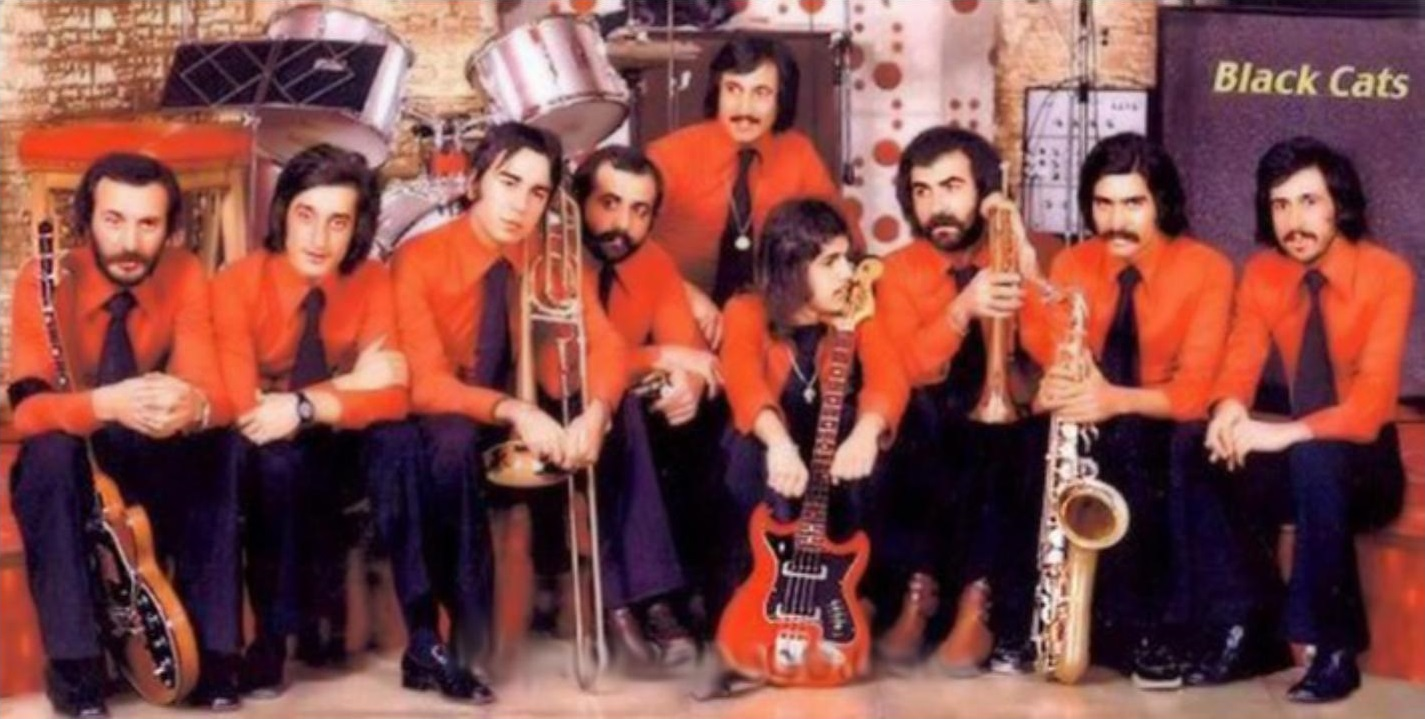
Ebi in Black Cats Band (1960's)

Inspired by The Beatles, he formed a beat band known as "The Rebels" with Shahram Shabpareh and Siavash Ghomayshi in the mid 60's. He was also a part of the "Sunboys" and "Black Cats" bands, before embarking on a career as a solo singer.

He left Iran to tour the United States in 1977, before the Islamic Revolution of 1979 and he stayed there after the revolution.

In 1990, he released the joint album Noon O Panir O Sabzi with Dariush. In the same year, he performed a joint concert with Dariush at the Universal Amphitheater.

The song Khalij-e Hamishegi-ye Fars (Persian Gulf forever) (Note: also known as Khalij and Khalij-e Fars) is one of Ebi's most famous songs, the lyrics of this song is by Adel Hassani and the composer of this song is Mohammad Shams. The name of the album Khalij is because of this song. Ebi stated that this song is one of the few songs that he is proud of himself for performing.

In 1995, Ebi released the album Setarehaye Sorbi with the lyrics of Iraj Janatie Ataie and the composition of Siavash Ghomayshi. In the Manoto's "Behtarinhaye Behtarinha", which showed the top 20 songs of Ebi as chosen by the people, the song Kee Ashkato Pak Mikoneh and Setarehaye Sorbi won the first and second place, respectively, and both of these songs are from this album. Also, the song Ghebleh from this album was ranked 17th.

Among his "politically charged" songs, Hala (1999), written by the Iranian poet Mina Assadi and produced by Esfandiar Monfaredzadeh. He called this song his most important political song in an interview in 2013 with the TV channel Manoto.

In 2009 Ebi again commented on the domestic politics of Iran by singing the song "Tasmim" (Decision) as a response to the 2009 presidential election.

Ebi collaborated with Shadmehr Aghili in several songs. He did a joint world tour with Shadmehr called "Royaye Ma" in 2012.

Ebi released the joint song Nostalgia with Googoosh by Radio Javan in 2014. Ebi and Googoosh started their joint world concert tour called "Nostalgia". The tour started with the Dubai concert.

He released the album Jan-e Javani (2014). He also started the world tour of this album.

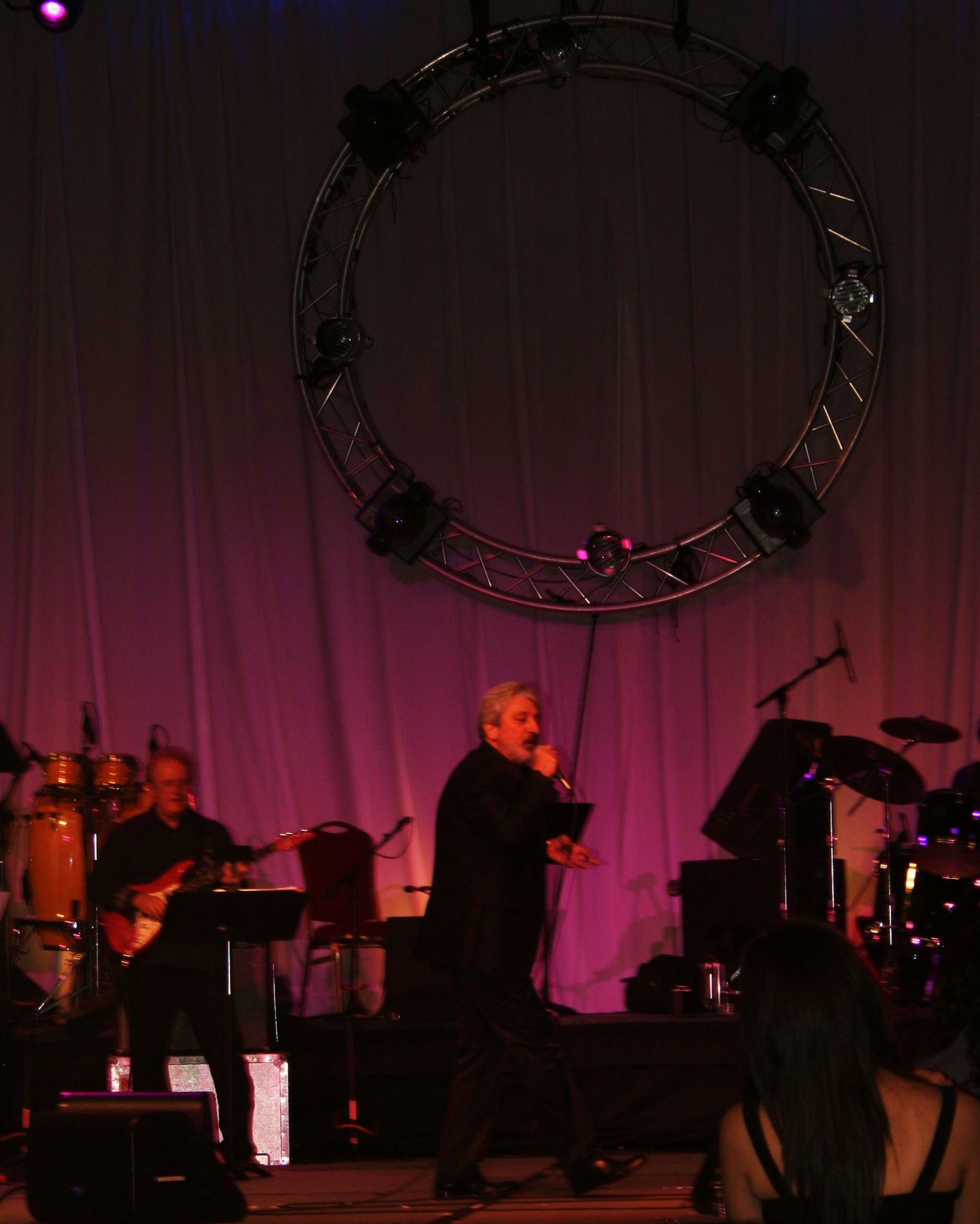
Ebi performing in Las Vegas (2008)

Ebi released his last album called Lalehzaar in 2019. The song Koocheye Nastaran in this album, which is a political song and is about the Iran–Iraq war, was controversial.

In 2020, Ebi appeared on Persia's Got Talent.

Ebi participated in the protests against Ebrahim Raisi's presence in front of the United Nations and supported the Iranian protests.

He started his new world tour called "The Love Project" in 2022. This tour was postponed due to COVID-19.

== Personal life ==
Ebi has three daughters from his first wife, Firouze Meghdadi. They divorced after 25 years of marriage.

He divides his time between Marbella, Spain and Los Angeles with his second wife, Mahshid Boroumand. In the early 2000s, he lived in Sweden. Ebi has a stepson from Mahshid.

== Philanthropy ==
In July 2020, Ebi launched a fundraising campaign through his personal charity, the "Ba Tou" (With You) Foundation, urging his fans to donate to UNICEF. To incentivize contributions, he announced that if the campaign reached its $10,000 goal, he would completely shave off his beard for the first time since 1971.The financial target was met rapidly, prompting Ebi to post a video on his Instagram account showing him shaving his face clean after nearly fifty years. In the caption, he wrote that while he had avoided shaving for decades, he had set this specific charitable milestone as the only condition under which he would do so. He expressed surprise at how quickly the funds were raised, stating he "never thought the donations would be collected so fast, forcing him to go stand in front of the mirror."

== Political views and activism ==
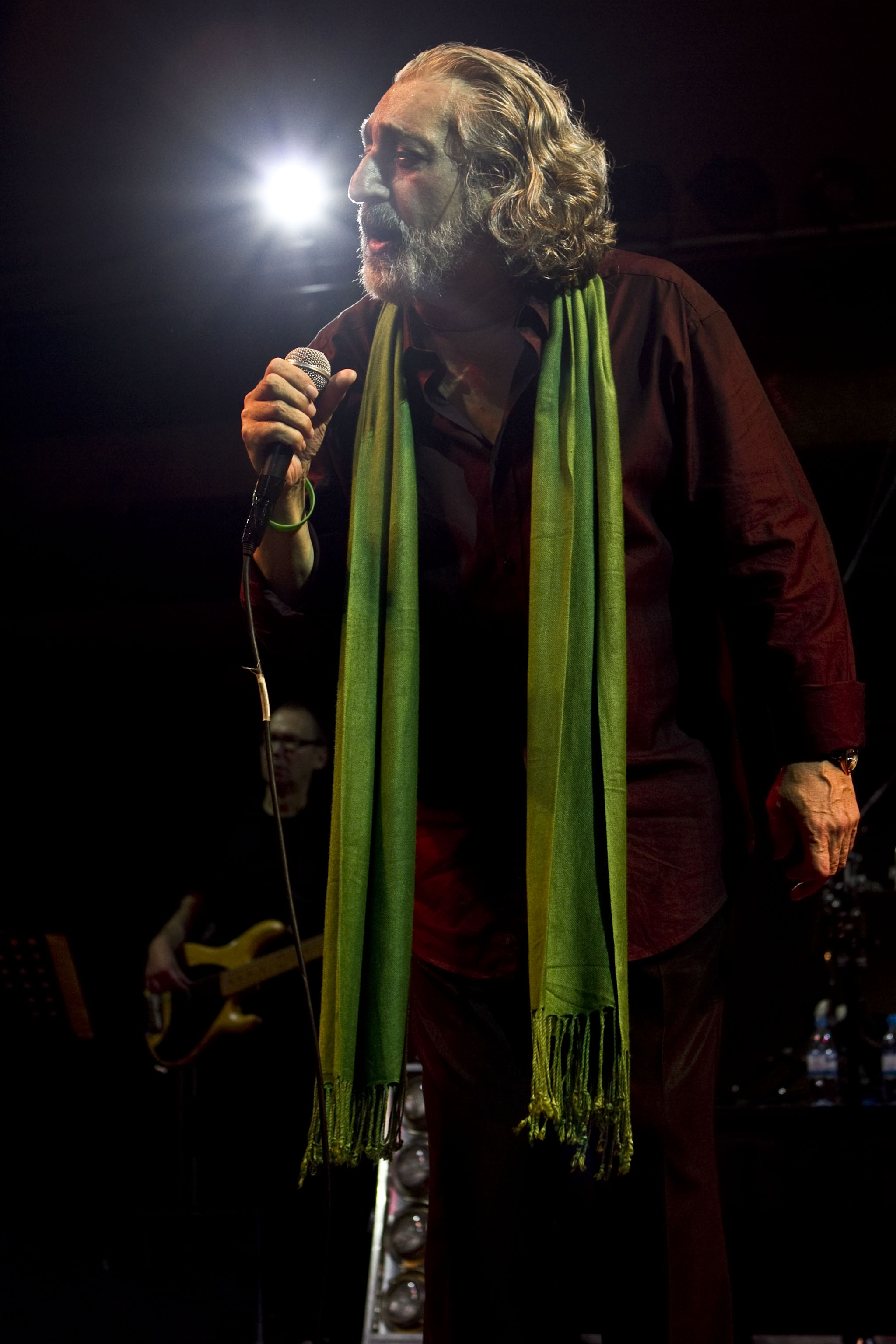
Ebi performing in Malaysia in 2010

Even before the 1979 Iranian Revolution, Ebi had recorded several social and protest songs. His track "Shekar" (The Hunt) was notably banned from radio broadcasts for two years, only gaining widespread domestic airplay after it won an award at an international music festival in Turkey. However, it was his forced exile following the revolution that firmly established his public image as a political and protest singer, frequently drawing comparisons to his contemporary, Dariush. In the decades following the revolution, Ebi has released approximately 15 songs with distinct political and social themes, expressing his opposition to the current Iranian government. In a September 2008 interview, he stated, "The Islamic Revolution was the absolute most unnecessary and unneeded thing that could have happened to that country."

Prior to the 2009 Iranian presidential election, Ebi released a protest song titled "Tasmim" (Decision). Featuring an allegorical music video, the release was seen as foreshadowing the severe political unrest that followed the election and garnered attention from international news agencies.

=== Dubai concert controversy ===
Ebi became the subject of significant backlash following a concert in Dubai, during which he deliberately omitted his famous patriotic song, Khalij-e Hamishegi-ye Fars (Persian Gulf forever), from his setlist. He later addressed the controversy, explaining that the omission was a calculated decision to avoid provoking UAE authorities. He stated that he did not want to risk having his annual concerts canceled, which would prevent him from returning to Dubai and performing for his fans.

== Discography ==
Harighe Sabz (2006)
A 29-second preview of Ebi's "Harighe Sabz", a pop song, from the Hasrate Parvaz album.

=== Albums ===
- "Tapesh" (1974)
- "Nazi Naz Kon" (1976)
- "Shab Zadeh" (1987)
- "Kouhe Yakh" (1987)
- "Khalij" (1990)
- "Gharibeh" (1990)
- "Noon O Panir O Sabzi" (with Dariush) (1990)
- "Setareh Donbaleh Dar" (1993)
- "Moalleme Bad" (1992)
- "Atal Matal" (1994)
- "Setarehaye Sorbi" (1995)
- "Atre To" (1996)
- "Ba To" (1996)
- "Taje Taraneh" (1997)
- "Pir" (1999)
- "Tolou Kon" (1999)
- "Shabe Niloufari" (2003)
- "Hasrate Parvaz" (2006)
- "Remembrance of Kamran & Hooman and Ebi" (With Kamran & Hooman) (2009)
- "Hesse Tanhaee" (2011)
- "Jane Javani" (2014)
- "Lalehzaar" (2019)

=== Singles ===
- "Hamkhoon", ft. Shahrokh (1981)
- "Khali" "New Version" (2008)
- "Hamin Khoobe" ft. Shadmehr Aghili (2013)
- "Negaranet Misham" (2013)
- "Ye Dokhtar" ft. Shadmehr Aghili (2013)
- "I Can Hear Christmas" – with Liel Kolet (2013)
- "Nostalgia" ft. Googoosh (2014)
- "Ki Ashkato Pak Mikoneh" ft. Googoosh (2014)
- "Delpoosh" (2016)
- "Assal" (2016)
- "Nafas Nafas" "Remix" (2017)
- "Kash" (Unofficial) (With Tohi) (2018)
- "Zakhme Namaree" (2020)
- "Horme To" (2021)
- "Tehrane Man" (2022)
- "Shab Geryeh "Live Version" (2022)
- "Ghafase Doa O Dar" (2023)
- "Khanoom Gol & Jabe Javaher) "Live Version"(2023)
- ″Be Salamatit″ (2024)

== See also ==
- Fereydoun Farrokhzad
- Arash
- Mina Assadi
