= Masoud (musician) =

Masoud مسعود
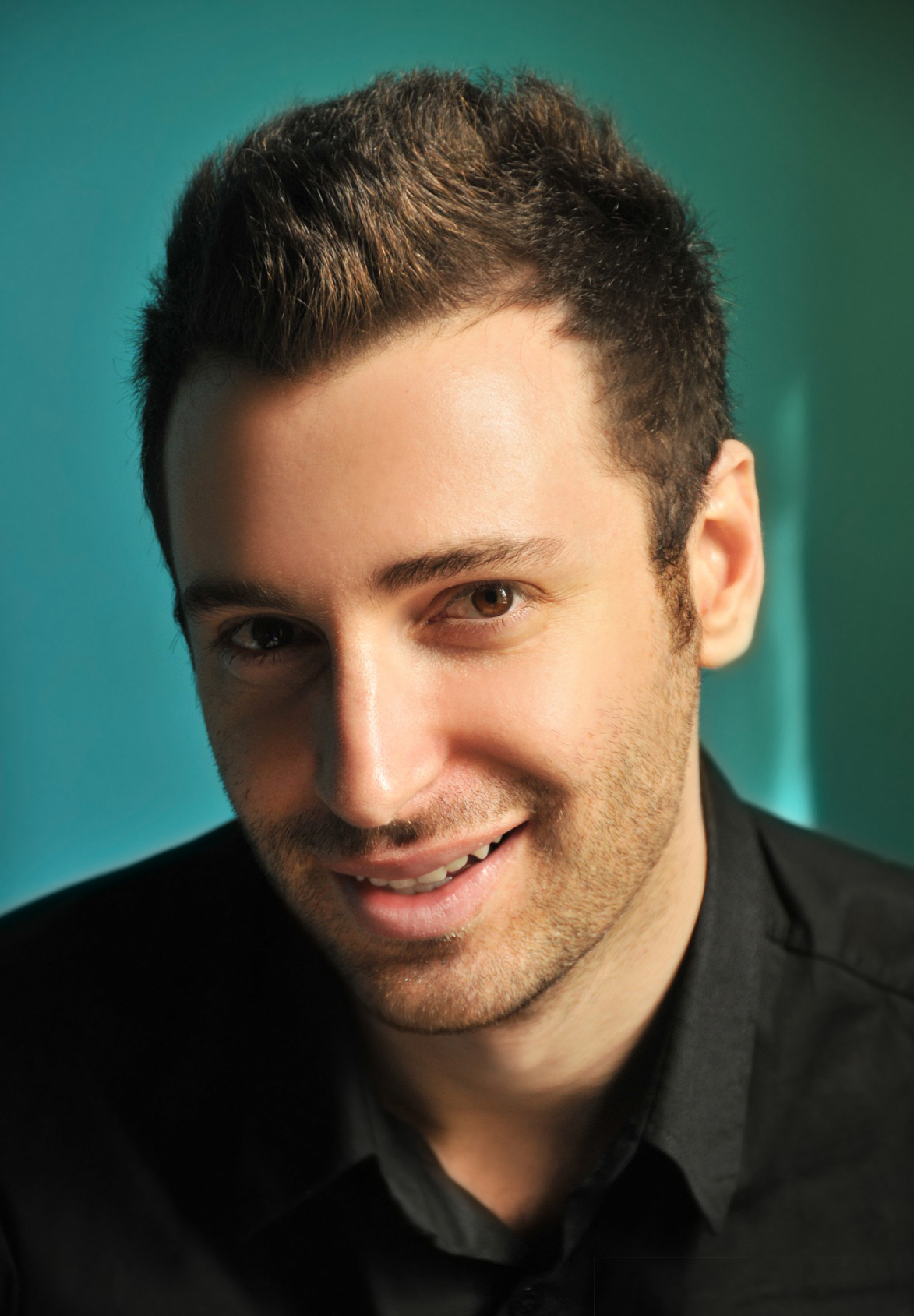
- Masoud in 2011; press photo shoot by Ardeshir Sabeti

Background information
- Birth name: Masoud Fouladi Moghaddam مسعود فولادی مقدم
- Also known as: Caspian Beat, Dj MaSound, Masoud Fuladi
- Born: May 22, 1985 (age 39); Bandar-e Anzali, Iran
- Genres: Electronic dance music, Progressive house, Vocal trance, progressive trance
- Occupation(s): Music producer, artist, dj
- Instrument(s): Keyboard, piano, guitar
- Years active: 2009–present
- Labels: Armada Music, AVA Recordings, Flashover Recordings
- Website: masoudfuladi.com

Masoud (Persian: مسعود, born Masoud Fouladi Moghaddam (Persian: مسعود فولادی مقدم); May 22, 1985) is an Iranian record producer, artist, and DJ living in Bandar-e Anzali, Iran. He is known for leading the electronic dance music artist community in Iran.

== Biography ==
He started working as a dance music producer at the end of 2009 by collaborating with Jaren Cerf as a songwriter and her sister Josie on vocals which is called "Leave It All Behind" signed by Ferry Corsten's label Flashover Recordings and got supports by Armin Van Buuren and Ferry Corsten. After the success of this single Masoud got to remix "Staring at the Sea" by New York-based Musician "Dj Eco Pres. Pacheco" and supported by British Trance Group Above & Beyond (band) and Ferry Corsten then hit the Beatport top20 chart. Platinum selling rapper Meek Mill sampled "Leave It All Behind (PrOmid Remix)" on "Young Ni**a Dream" featuring YFN Lucci and Barcelini in 2017.

In year 2010 Masoud teamed up with Jaren Cerf again and made "Blinded". The vocal performed by a Los Angeles-based Model/Singer "Laurie". Sebastian Brandt remix of Blinded marked as a "Tune of the Week" on A State of Trance #453 by Armin van Buuren and got number 1 "Tune of the Month" on Ferry Corsten's Countdown Radio Show in May.

Andy Moor put Masoud's new EP in his Compilation CD "Breaking The Silence Vol. 2" and Signed it to the Armada Music which is run by Armin Van Buuren in 2011 and supported by Paul Oakenfold and Richard Durand, Faruk Sabanci's remix hit #1 on Juno Download Store. After that he signed a deal to Teletunez Inc. in 2011 to write for TV music with Brian Wayy.

His remix of "Arlanda" an Uplifting trance track by Sophie Sugar and Tom Colontonio released under A State of Trance (label) which is a sub-label of Armada Music and reached Dash Berlin's Top15 in May 2011.

Masoud's releases and remixes got into compilations such as "Trance Nation 2010", "Armada Lounge Vol.5", "The Ibiza SoundTrack 2011", "50 Ibiza Trance Tunes 2012", "Vocal Trance Sessions 2010", "20 Vocal Trance Anthems – 2012 Spring Edition", "Trance 75, 2012", "Trance 100 2010 & 2011 & 2012", "AVA Recordings Collected & Best of 2011" by the record labels like Ministry of Sound, Armada Music, Spinnin' Records and Flashover Recordings

In year 2014 Masoud signed three songs to Armada Music featuring Melissa Loretta, Alexandra Badoi and Aneym supported by Armin Van Buuren, Above & Beyond (band), Ferry Corsten, Andy Moor

Masoud started an EDM project with Emmy Award winner Brian Wayy in 2015 and called it "MaWayy" and released first single "Wrong" in 2017 under Teletunez's division HitTunez and Blanco Y Negro record label includes remixes by Joe Maz and Ayin. this record hit No.42 on Billboard Dance Club Songs chart in May 2018 for 3 weeks and became No.1 record on WCPY "Dance Factory FM" station in Chicago

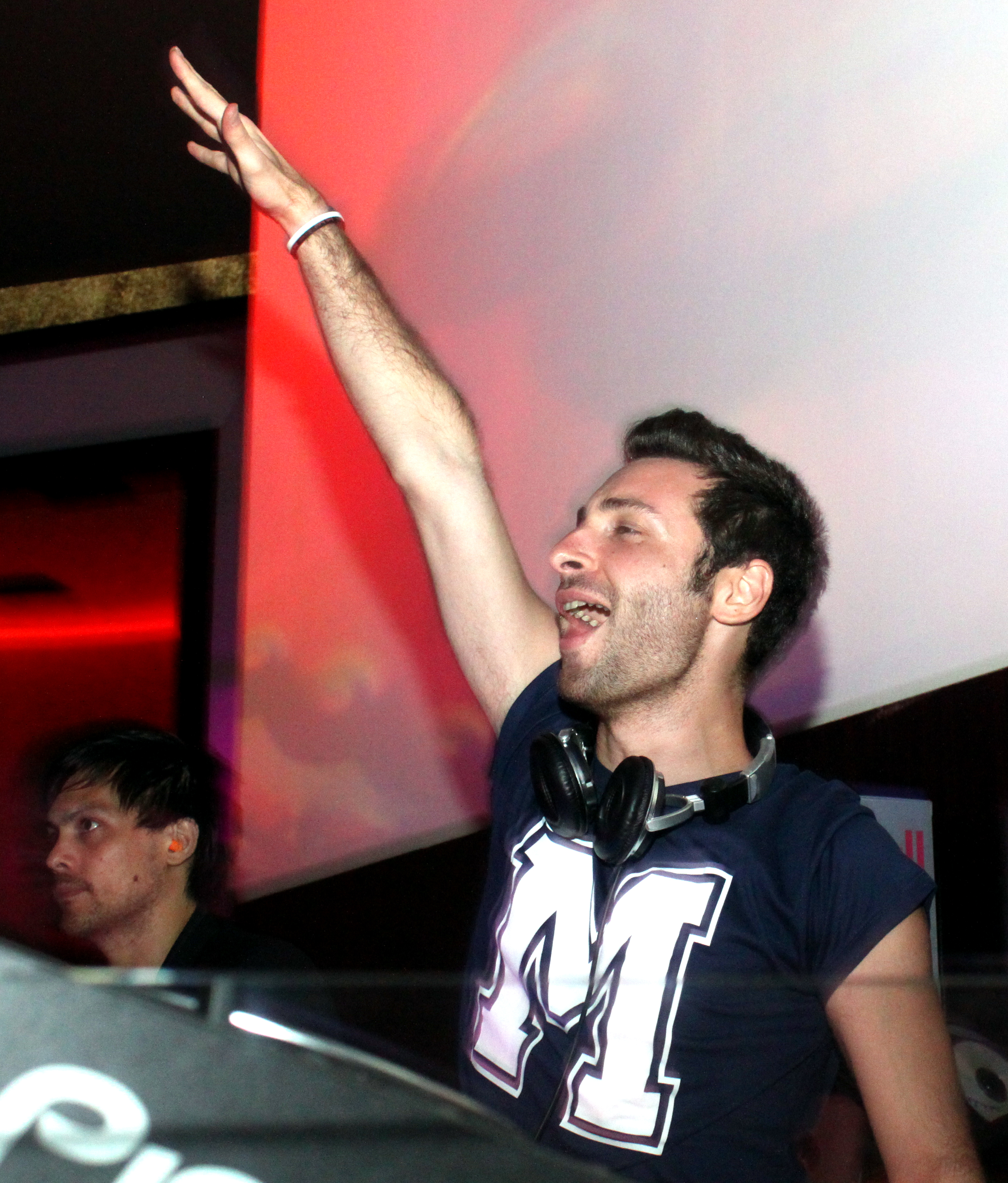
Masoud Fouladi Moghaddam Spinning at Sanctuary Club Atlantis Hotel Dubai June 23, 2010

== The Caspian Sessions ==
He hosts a bi-weekly radio show entitled "The Caspian Sessions" on the trance radio Afterhours.FM and podcast on the Iranian Entertainment website Bia2.com A selection of the progressive trance, house and electro tunes at the moment plus a chillout song at the end of the show. Masoud picks a song as his favourite of every sessions. On June 9, 2015 the radio show airplay changed from Afterhours.FM to Digitally Imported DJ Mixes channel on a monthly basis. Masoud cancelled this show after 100 episodes.

== Discography ==
=== Singles ===
- 2009 "Masoud Feat. Josie – Leave It All Behind [Flashover Recordings/Levare]" (Tritonal, Jorn van Deynhoven, Amurai, Promid Remixes)
- 2010 "Masoud Feat. Laurie – Blinded [Flashover Recordings/Levare]" (Sebastian Brandt, Ginatron Remixes)
- 2011 "Caspian Beat – Seven [PM Music]"
- 2011 "Dj MaSound – Don't Be Afraid [Lost Language]"
- 2012 "Masoud Feat. Nicole McKenna – Fix The Broken [Armada Music/AVA]"
- 2014 "Masoud Feat. Melissa Loretta - Best Days [Armada/Statement!]"
- 2015 "Masoud Feat. Hysteria! - Pull Me Back Again [Black Hole Recordings]"
- 2016 "Masoud Feat. Tara Louise – My Dreams"
- 2017 "MaWayy – Wrong [HitTunez/Blanco y Negro Music]"
- 2018 "MaWayy – Blame [HitTunez]"
- 2020 "MaWayy – Calling Her My Name [Epic Oslo/Sony Music]" (LIZOT, Glowinthedark Remixes)
- 2021 "MaWayy – Run Run Run [Epic Oslo/Sony Music]" (Alex Ross, Glowinthedark Remixes)

=== EPs ===
- 2011 "Masoud – Here We Go [feat. Hannah Ray] / Skyward [Armada Music/AVA]" (Faruk Sabanci, Ginatron, Phillipe El Sisi Remixes)
- 2014 "Masoud Feat. Alexandra Bădoi - Where Is The Sunrise", "Masoud Feat. Aneym - No More". As the label's website says, "‘No More’ is a summery tune fit for radio and long days, while ‘Where Is The Sunrise’ takes a slightly more ominous tone."
- 2016 "Masoud Feat. Tara Louise - My Dreams / Goodbye" [Silk Music] (Vintage & Morelli, meHiLove Remixes)

=== Remixes ===
- 2010 "Dj Eco Pres. Pacheco – Staring at the Sea (Masoud Remix) [Flashover Recordings]"
- 2010 "Tasadi – Jupiter (Masoud Remix) [Lost Language]"
- 2010 "Dave Emanuel – Four Noble Truths (Masoud Remix) [Harmonic Breezre Recordings]"
- 2011 "Sophie Sugar & Tom Colontonio – Arlanda (Masoud Remix) [Armada Music/ASOT]"
- 2012 "Store N Forward – Listen To Life (Masoud Remix) [Afterglow]"
- 2012 "Andy Moor Feat. Sue McLaren – Fight The Fire (Masoud Chillout Mix) [Armada Music]"
- 2012 "Andy Moor Feat. Sue McLaren – Trespass (Masoud Chillout Mix) [Armada Music/AVA]"

== Charts ==
Song	Year	Chart	Weeks	Peak position
"Blame"	2019	US Dance Club Songs (Billboard)	9	18
"Blame"	2019	UK Upfront Club (Music Week)	4	13
"Wrong"	2018	US Dance Club Songs (Billboard)	3	42
