= Charlie Atom =

Mexican DJ (born 1988)

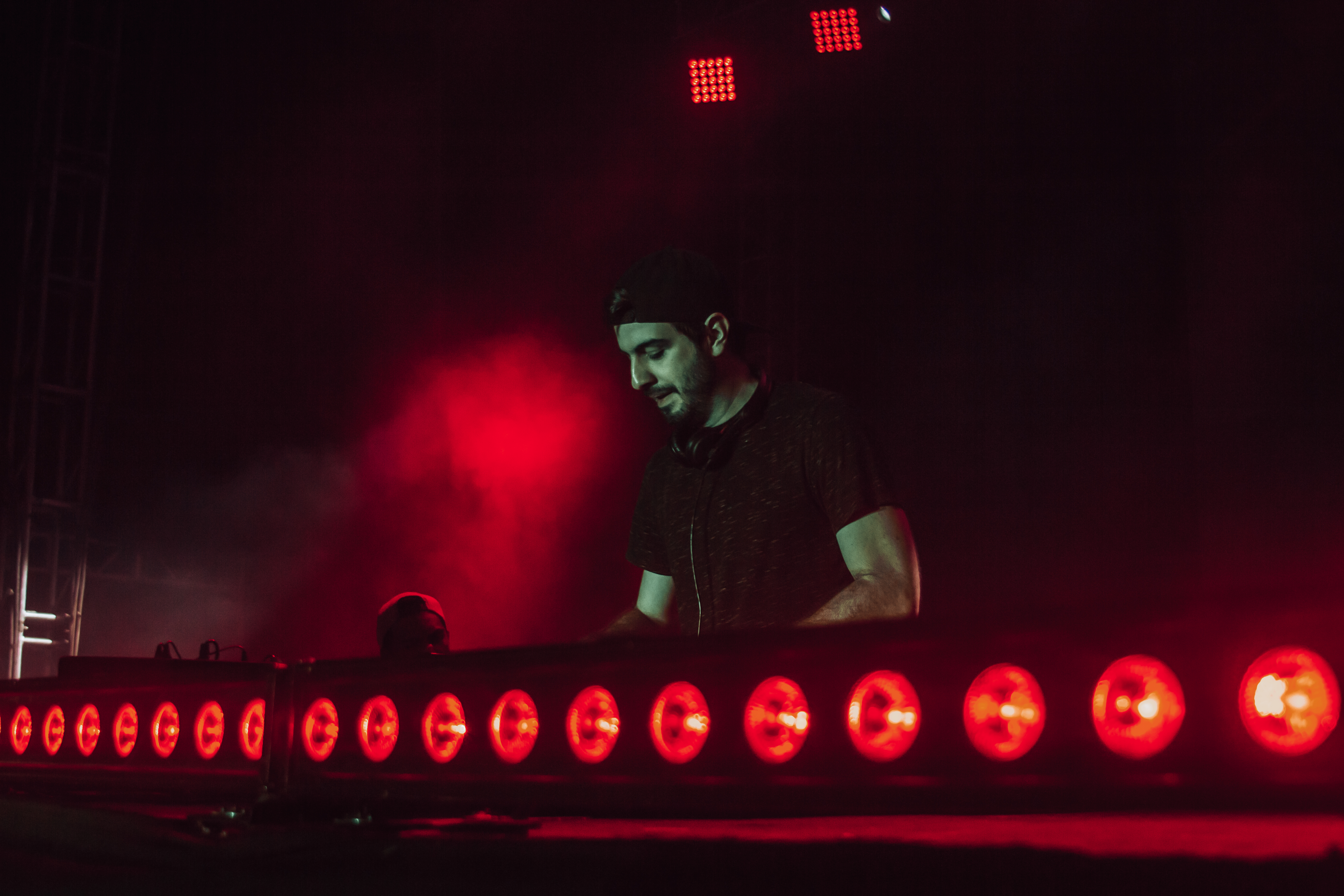

Background information
- Born: Jose Carlos Pelaez Lazo; July 21, 1988 (age 37); Veracruz, Mexico
- Genres: Pop, EDM, Electro House, Progressive House, Psychedelic music
- Occupations: Music Producer, Composer, DJ, Songwriter
- Instruments: Laptop, turntable, synthesizer, piano, guitar, bass guitar, drums
- Years active: 2010–present
- Labels: Sony Music, Blanco y Negro, Warner Music, Sony Music
- Website: charlieatom.tv

José Carlos Peláez Lazo (born July 21, 1988), known by his stage name Charlie Atom, is a Mexican-Spanish DJ and multi-instrumentalist electronic dance music producer who combines many genres of music like house, rock, pop, classical music and more to create his music and aims to conceptual tracks. He is known for making progressive melodies and using melodic structures to make a narrative on his tracks. He has released music on Sony Music and Warner Music, performed on Electric Daisy Carnival 2019 and 2020 and Formula 1, also have made soundtracks for feature films and videogames under the alias Charlie Pelaez. He has been working as a freelance Ghost Producer and custom remixer since 2015 and recently on Fiverr.

== Background ==
Atom started playing the piano and composing when he was a child. He used to do multitrack recording using two cassette recorders and his keyboard at that time. He learned to play guitar, bass guitar and drums before he was 15 years old, and also learned to use audio software to produce rock songs.

He started as a professional DJ and EDM producer in 2010 under the name of Charlie Atom. In 2010, he signed Whirlpool (Remixes) in the netlabel Another Chance Records. He has made releases to many other record labels, and in 2011 he released his first studio album Psychedelhi which he decided to release for free and been reviewed in the web magazine Consequence of Sound. In 2016, he was signed by Ensis Records for the track "Slippin Away ft. Emma Harrop" and Blanco y Negro Music with his track "Winter" with Belgian DJ Michael Fall and with English singer and composer Joe Bateman. The track has been played in many places around the world including the Belgian FM radio station TOPradio and it reached the Ultratop Belgian chart up to number 41. He also has officially remade tracks such as "Numb" from Linkin Park. Later on his releases got supported by DJs like Breathe Carolina. His track "Black Magic", released on Ensis Records, got support by Blasterjaxx, and many other DJs. He also played some big festivals in México, including Daydream Festival and Electric Daisy Carnival. In 2019, he made his first release on Sony Music remixing Mexican artists Félix y Gil with their track "Café en la Mesa".

Atom toured on China with the company SG Entertainment in 2019 and 2020 and was main star on the Nanchang's The King new years party.

Now he works with many labels including his own label Atomik Records, which got support by Don Diablo.

== Discography ==
=== Singles ===
- 2011 Whirlpool (Remixes) (Another Chance Records)
- 2015 Free (Full Room Records)
- 2016 Slippin Away with Emma Harrop (Ensis Records)
- 2016 Winter with Michael Fall & Joe Bateman (Blanco y Negro Music)
- 2016 Feeling Alright ft. Adriana Lucia (CR2 Records)
- 2017 Space Commander (Atomik Records)
- 2017 Today ft. Emma Harrop (Blanco y Negro Music)
- 2017 Break The Rules with Emma Harrop (Ensis Records)
- 2017 Estallar with Obed Veiga (+Mas, EMPO)
- 2017 Numb with Emma Harrop (+Mas, EMPO)
- 2017 Gone with Michael Fall & Drew Darcy (ZYX Music)
- 2017 Un Beso with Obed Veiga (+Mas, EMPO)
- 2017 Black Magic(Ensis Records)
- 2018 Sharks(Atomik Records)
- 2018 Nebula (+Mas, EMPO)
- 2018 Ali Shuffle with Big Punch (+Mas, EMPO)
- 2018 Galactica(Atomik Records)
- 2019 Balloons(Atomik Records)
- 2019 Felix y Gil - Café en la Mesa (Charlie Atom Remix)(Sony Music)

=== Albums ===
- 2011 Psychedelhi (Independent)
- 2016 Nebula (Unreleased)

=== Official Remixes ===
- 2011 Lorenzo Lellini - WOW (Charlie Atom Remix)
- 2012 Phonat - Love Hits The Fan (Charlie Atom Remix)
- 2015 Rednex - Cotton Eyed Joe (Charlie Atom Remix)

=== Digital Compilations ===
- 2011 Dance Summer Compilation vol.1 (Another Chance Records) "Arcadia"
- 2011 Dance Summer Compilation vol.1(Another Chance Records) "Story of a Life"
- 2014 Tech House Sektor Vol. 17 (Achterdeck) "Whirlpool (Los Teques Mix)"
- 2014 Electro Bangerz (Another Chance Records) "Arcadia"
- 2015 Best of 2015 (Full Room Records) "Free"
- 2015 Hey DJ in the Music Vol. 8 (Full Room Records) "Free"
- 2016 Best of CR2 2016 (CR2 Records) "Feeling Alright"
- 2017 Restricted Essential Anthems Vol. 1 (High Pro-File Recordings) "Whirlpool"
- 2017 Carnival Collection Techno Vol. 1 (High Pro-File Recordings) "Whirlpool (Giuliano Rodrigues Mix)"
- 2017 Transmission Express Vol.1 (High Pro-File Recordings) "Whirlpool"
- 2017 CR2 Live & Direct (CR2 Records) "Feeling Alright"
- 2017 Hey DJ in the Music Vol. 11 (Full Room Records) "Free"
- 2017 Miami 2017 (CR2 Records) "Feeling Alright"
- 2017 The Sound of Miami (iCompilations) "Feeling Alright"
- 2017 CR2 Live & Direct April 2017 (CR2 Records) "Feeling Alright"

=== CD Compilations ===
- 2016 Summertime (Blanco y Negro Music) "Winter"
- 2016 Deep & House Ibiza (Vendetta Records) "Winter"
- 2016 I Like Fiesta 2016 (Blanco y Negro Music) "Winter"
- 2016 Blanco y Negro Dj Culture Vol.6 (Blanco y Negro Music) "Winter"
- 2017 Musicote Sessions (Blanco y Negro Music) "Today"
- 2017 Blanco y Negro Dj Culture Vol.17 (Blanco y Negro Music) "Today"
