= MaWayy =

American-Iranian music duo

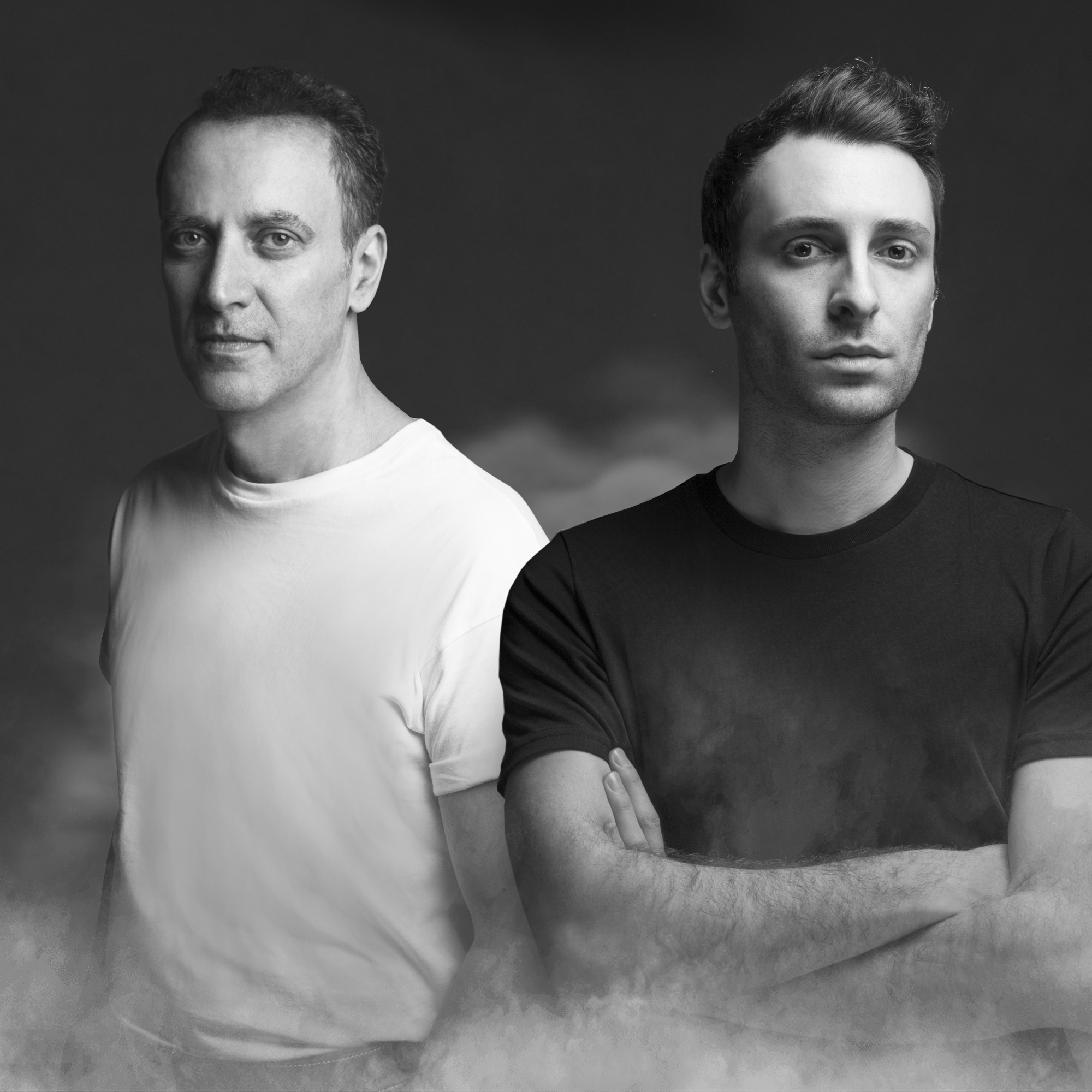
- 2016 Press Photo Shoot By Hamed Arts

Background information
- Origin: Los Angeles, United States; Bandar-e Anzali, Iran
- Genres: Electronic dance music, Tropical house, Pop music
- Occupations: Music producer, Artist, DJ
- Instruments: Keyboard, Piano
- Years active: 2015–present
- Labels: Spinnin' Records, Sony Music Norway, Epic Oslo, HitTunez, Blanco y Negro Music
- Members: Brian Wayy; Masoud Fuladi
- Website: www.mawayy.com

MaWayy is an American-Iranian music duo from Los Angeles, United States and Bandar-e Anzali, Iran consisting of producers and DJs Brian Wayy and Masoud Fuladi.[2] They are known for their Billboard charting songs "Wrong" and "Blame" and hosting "MaWayy radio" show on Digitally Imported Radio. In 2020, MaWayy signed their song "Calling Her My Name" to Sony Music Norway and became India Viral 50 Spotify charts, radio stations top 40 such as N-JOY and Laluna

== Charts ==
Song	Year	Chart	Peak position
"Happy Here"	2025	UK Upfront Club (Music Week)	6
"I'm Too Sexy"	2024	UK Commercial Pop Club (Music Week)	4
"Blame"	2019	US Dance Club Songs (Billboard)	18
"Blame"	2019	UK Upfront Club (Music Week)	13
"Wrong"	2018	US Dance Club Songs (Billboard)	42
