= Brian Wayy =

American songwriter

- Born: Tehran, Iran
- Genres: Dance
- Occupations: Composer, music producer, songwriter, remixer
- Instruments: Keyboard, piano

Brian Wayy is an Iranian-American Emmy Award winning television composer, producer, songwriter and remixer. At the age of 18 he signed a contract with MCA Records and by 24 he toured with The Untouchables, opening for major acts like UB40, The Police, and Duran Duran. Wayy remixed major artists such as Rod Stewart, Paula Abdul, The Doobie Brothers and produced Diana Ross, Stevie B, Corbin Bleu.

After his recording career he got signed by Warner Bros. Television and started composing for TV shows like The Ellen DeGeneres Show, Judge Mathis, TMZ on TV, Extra, The Bachelor, The First Family, America's Court with Judge Ross, Justice for All with Judge Cristina Perez.

In 2015 he partnered up with Masoud Fuladi and started an Electronic dance music project called MaWayy and released his first single "Wrong" in August 2017 under Teletunez's division HitTunez and Blanco Y Negro record label includes remixes by Joe Maz and Ayin. In May 2018 this song ranked No.42 on Billboard Dance Club Songs chart for three weeks. It became the No.1 record on WCPY "Dance Factory FM" station in Chicago.
