= Ready for the Good Times =

Ready for the Good Times may refer to:

- "Ready for the Good Times" (Michael Fall song), from the 2013 album Turn On Your Radio
- "Ready for the Good Times" (Shakira song), from the 2001 album Laundry Service
