= Don't You Want My Lovin' =

Don't you want my lovin' or similar may refer to:

- "Don't You Want My Lovin'", a 1965 single by The Orlons
- "Don't You Want My Lovin'", a song by Michael Fall from the 2013 album Turn On Your Radio
