= Shahrum Kashani =

Iranian pop singer (1971–2021)

Shahrum Kashani شهرام کاشانی
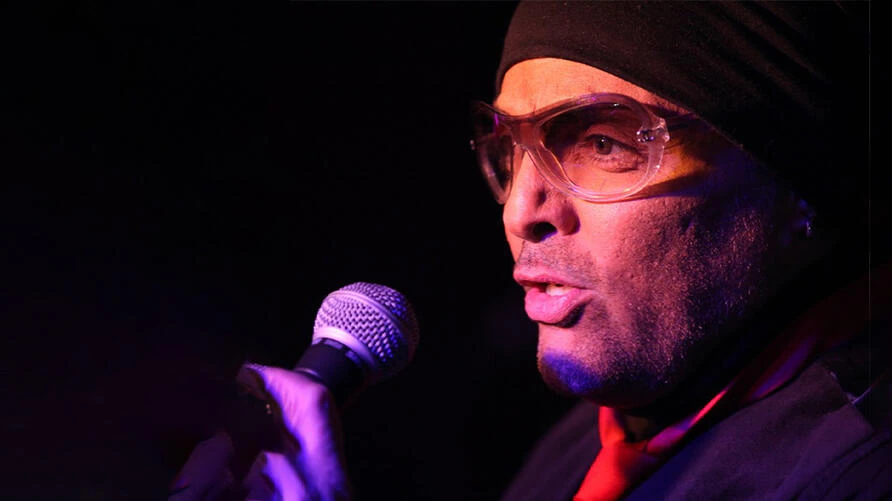

Background information
- Also known as: Shahrum K; SK
- Born: Shahrum Shahbal; 7 July 1971; Rome, Italy
- Died: 28 July 2021 (aged 50) Istanbul, Turkey
- Genres: Pop, dance
- Occupation: Singer
- Instruments: Keyboard, vocals
- Years active: 1991–2021
- Labels: Caltex Records (1991–2000); Taraneh Records (2000–2021); Avang Music (2016–2018)
- Formerly of: Sepideh; Leila Forouhar

Shahrum Kashani (Persian: شهرام کاشانی; 7 July 1971 – 28 July 2021) was an Iranian pop singer. He released eight albums with notable hits.

== Biography ==
=== Music ===
Kashani's interest in singing and music manifested at an early age. He started his career in 1990; however, it was not until 1991 that he released his professional debut album titled K-One, promoted by Alireza Amirghassemi, and also with support of Persian super star Leila Forouhar. Due to his youth, synergy, and style, he gained popularity in a short amount of time.

International popularity came with his second album Atash with hits like Begou Tou Begou and Khater Khah. In 2000, he stopped working with Caltex Records and instead signed on with Taraneh Records. This collaboration yielded a couple of instant bestsellers. The hit songs Dokhtar Bandari, Yadam Nemireh and Dige Basteh became club favorites. In a 2005 interview with Tapesh, Kashani talked about his childhood, about his parents' divorce and his mom's short marriage to Googoosh's first husband. Kashani also, in this interview, blamed Taraneh Records for not promoting his new album Khoshalam enough and delaying its release. His claim was dismissed by the owner of Taraneh, Vartan Avenassian, who cited immaturity of the singer as cause of their tense relationship.

In August 2006, Kashani's new music video from his latest album Game Over (directed by élan productions), was aired on all Persian satellite channels. Despite his complications with the record company, this album was still released by Taraneh Records. His latest music, Sahneh Sazi, was performed at Valley Oaks Memorial Park at his funeral, and artists such as Andranik Madadian and Shahbal Shabpareh attended his funeral and spoke about Kashani. Ali Hosseinzadeh, composer and songwriter of Shahrum Kashani's latest song, explained about this song in an interview with KIRN Los Angeles Radio. "The idea of making this song was formed many years ago, considering the events that took place in Shahrum's personal life, I wrote this song. Shahrum called this song an elevator because I refer to life somewhere in the poem, which is like an elevator. Life is like an elevator, it raises some up, but he who is down is sad. Shahrum went to his studio in Los Angeles twice to record this song and recorded it several times. Because he was telling me I think my feelings are not real".

=== Health ===
Kashani had a long battle with alcoholism and was sober for several months during his stay in Istanbul, but relapsed months prior to his death. Legendary Iranian singer, Dariush Eghbali tried to help him with his alcoholism. He died in hospital in Istanbul from COVID-19, while being treated for liver problems brought on by alcoholism.

=== Birth and family ===
Kashani was born in Rome, Italy, and lived and spoke Italian until the age of 7.But his grandfather, out of patriotism, obtained his birth certificate in Tehran. He left Iran as a teenager. He lived for several years in Turkey, where he said he was fluent in Istanbul Turkish. At the age of 18, he began his singing career in the United States; he also spent three years in Dubai and then settled in Los Angeles.

== Discography ==
Caltex Records releases

- 1991: K-One
- 1994: Atash
- 1996: Havas
- 1998: Friends

Taraneh Records releases

- 2000: Color Of Love
- 2003: Don't Tell
- 2005: Khoshalam
- 2006: Game Over

K-One 1991
| Track name | Lyricist | Composer | Arrangement |
|---|---|---|---|
| Negahe Tou | Fereydoun Alikhani | Shahrum Kashani | Andranik Asaturian |
| Ham Nafas | Fereydoun Alikhani | Shahrum Kashani | Bob Par |
| Dokhtare Shahre Gheseh | Homayoun Houshiarnejad | Shahbal Shabpareh | Shahbal Shabpareh |
| Nakoneh | Fereydoun Alikhani | Shahrum Kashani & Fereydoun Alikhani | Manouchehr Cheshmazar |
| Az Tou Cheh Penhoon | Jacklin | Jacklin | Armen Aharonian |
| Bazie Eshgh | Jacklin | Jacklin | Armen Aharonian |

Atash 1994
| Track name | Lyricist | Composer | Arrangement |
|---|---|---|---|
| Begoo Tou Begoo | Milad Salehpour | Milad Salehpour | Schubert Avakian |
| Nameh | Mahdad Zand-Karimi | Mahdad Zand-Karimi | Mahdad Zand-Karimi |
| Bivafa | Milad Salehpour | Milad Salehpour | Schubert Avakian |
| Hasood | Jahanbakhsh Pazooki | Jahanbakhsh Pazooki | David Betsamo |
| Khater Khah (Emroozo Farda) | Shahrzad | Anoushiravan Rohani | Schubert Avakian |
| Napors | Jacklin | Farzin Farhadi | Farzin Farhadi |
| Porsoon Porsoon | Asghar Vaqadi | Naser Zarabadi | Mahdad Zand-Karimi |
| Tou Mimooni | Jacklin | Shahrum Kashani | Farzin Farhadi |

Havas 1996
| Track name | Lyricist | Composer | Arrangement |
|---|---|---|---|
| Havas | Kamran Delan | Kamran Delan | Schubert Avakian |
| Mageh Man | Milad Salehpour | Milad Salehpour | Kaveh Haghighi |
| Man Ba Tou | Paksima Zakipour | Shahrum Kashani & Brian Wayy | Brian Wayy |
| Dele Bolhavas | Iraj Janatie Ataie | Babak Bayat | Ara Hairapetian |
| Dokhtar Pesare Irooni | Paksima Zakipour | Shahrum Kashani & Brian Wayy | Brian Wayy |
| Naro | Paksima Zakipour | Shahrum Kashani & Brian Wayy | Brian Wayy |
| Nameh | Kamran Delan | Kamran Delan | Schubert Avakian |

Friends 1998
| Track name | Lyricist | Composer | Arrangement |
|---|---|---|---|
| Eshghe | Paksima Zakipour | Shahrum Kashani | Schubert Avakian |
| Abroo Kamoon | Homa Mirafshar | Mohammad Moghaddam | Mohammad Moghaddam |
| Bargard | Paksima Zakipour | Shahrum Kashani | Schubert Avakian |
| Parishoon | Mahdad Zand-Karimi | Mahdad Zand-Karimi | Mahdad Zand-Karimi |
| Roozo Roozegar | Mahdad Zand-Karimi | Mahdad Zand-Karimi | Mahdad Zand-Karimi |
| Laj Nakon | Milad Salehpour | Milad Salehpour | Schubert Avakian |
| Rafti Rafti | Paksima Zakipour | Shahrum Kashani | David Betsamo |
| Tanham | Kamran Delan | Kamran Delan | David Betsamo |

The Color Of Love 2000
| Track name | Lyricist | Composer | Arrangement |
|---|---|---|---|
| Yadam Nemireh | Paksima Zakipour | Shahrum Kashani | Schubert Avakian |
| Dokhtar Bandari | Hatef | Hatef | Schubert Avakian |
| Faryad | Paksima Zakipour | Shahrum Kashani & Fred Mirza | Fred Mirza |
| Setareh | Hatef | Hatef | Schubert Avakian |
| Fasseleh | Paksima Zakipour | Shahrum Kashani | Schubert Avakian |
| Digeh Basteh | Paksima Zakipour | Shahrum Kashani | David Betsamo |
| Bavar Nadaram | Paksima Zakipour | Fred Mirza | Fred Mirza |
| Bonbast | Saeed Mohammadi | Saeed Mohammadi | Schubert Avakian |

Don't Tell 2003
| Track name | Lyricist | Composer | Arrangement |
|---|---|---|---|
| Nazi Joon | Behbood | Afghani | Schubert Avakian |
| Digeh Direh | Fariborz HajiNabi | Fariborz HajiNabi | Schubert Avakian |
| Naro Naro | Fariborz HajiNabi | Fariborz HajiNabi | Schubert Avakian |
| Ey Yaar | Fariborz HajiNabi | Fariborz HajiNabi | Schubert Avakian |
| Aftab | Fariborz HajiNabi | Fariborz HajiNabi | Schubert Avakian |
| Harf | Fariborz HajiNabi | Fariborz HajiNabi | Schubert Avakian |
| Boro Digeh | Fariborz HajiNabi | Fariborz HajiNabi | Schubert Avakian |
| Rain | José Feliciano | José Feliciano | Schubert Avakian |

Khoshhalam 2005
| Track name | Lyricist | Composer | Arrangement |
|---|---|---|---|
| Geryato Dar Miyaram | Shahram Farshid | Shahram Farshid | Schubert Avakian |
| Dorougheh | Taraneh Mokarram | Mehdi Zanganeh | Schubert Avakian |
| Hameh Migan | Farshid Vahdat & Shahram Farshid | Farshid Vahdat & Shahram Farshid | Schubert Avakian |
| Khoshhalam | Shahram Farshid | Shahram Farshid | Schubert Avakian |
| Alaleh | Fariborz HajiNabi | Fariborz HajiNabi | Schubert Avakian |
| Pat Vay Mistam | Shahram Farshid | Shahram Farshid | Schubert Avakian |
| Sarnevesht | Fariborz Roshanfekr | Shahram Farshid | Schubert Avakian |
| Ghahr O Ashti | Mahdieh Arab | Shahram Farshid | Schubert Avakian |

Game Over 2006
| Track name | Lyricist | Composer | Arrangement |
|---|---|---|---|
| Eltemas (I Beg of You) | Shahram Farshid | Shahram Farshid | Andy Gee |
| Divoonam kardi (You Make Me Crazy) | Shahram Farshid | Shahram Farshid | Andy Gee |
| Gole Yakh (Ice Flower) | Shahram Farshid | Shahram Farshid | Andy Gee |
| To Ki Hasti? (Who Are You?) | Shahram Farshid | Shahram Farshid | Andy Gee |
| Bazi Tamoomeh (Game Over) | Shahram Farshid | Shahram Farshid | Andy Gee |
| Azto Nemishe Gozasht (Unforgettable) | Shahram Farshid | Shahram Farshid | Andy Gee |
| Ye Much Bedeh (Give One Kiss) | Shahram Farshid | Shahram Farshid | Andy Gee |
| Eshgh Be Man Nayoomade (Love's Not 4 Me) | Shahram Farshid | Shahram Farshid | Andy Gee |

=== Soundtracks ===
Film Music
Circumstance 2011
Dokhtar Bandari
Maryam Keshavarz
Deauville Film Festival

=== Single Songs ===
| Track name | Songwriter | Composer | Arrangement | Release date |
|---|---|---|---|---|
| Madar | Raymond Shahnazarian | Shahrum Kashani | Schubert Avakian | |
| Iran Iran (Ft Aref) | | Shahrum Kashani | | 2006 |
| Eidee (Ft Sattar, Morteza & Sheila) | Amin Bamshad | Shahrum Kashani & Pouriya Niakan | Pouriya Niakan | 2007 |
| Oxygen (Ft Shahram Farshid) | Shahram Farshid | Shahram Farshid | Shahram Farshid | 2007 |
| Azar | Hatef | Hatef | Pouriya Niakan | 2008 |
| Havaee | Shahram Farshid | Shahram Farshid | Schubert Avakian | 2011 |
| Kheyli Vaghteh | Ali Hosseinzadeh & Shahram Farshid | Ali Hosseinzadeh & Shahram Farshid | Pouriya Niakan | 2011 |
| Bashi Nabashi | Amin Bamshad | Amin Bamshad | Pouriya Niakan | 2011 |
| To Bayad Bargardi | Maryam Zakeri | Fattah Fathi | Schubert Avakian | 2013 |
| Hesse Khoobi | Amin Bamshad | Amin Bamshad & Shahrum Kashani | Schubert Avakian | 2013 |
| Tarze Negahet | Neli | Ermia Nick | Ermia Nick | 2014 |
| Havasam Hast | Hooman Kamalzare | Yaser Mahmoudi | Yaser Mahmoudi | 2015 |
| Bro Bro | Mohammad Omid | Mohammad Omid | Mohammad Omid | 2016 |
| Ye Lahze | Nima Ebrahimi | Nima Ebrahimi | Arjang Tafaghodi | 2016 |
| Yasi | Farzam Feiz | Farzam Feiz | Mohammad Omid | 2017 |
| Nagi Nagoftama | Maryam Asadi | Milad Baran | Milad Beheshti | 2018 |
| Khejalat Nakesh | Shiva Rad | Ashkan Azad | Ashkan Azad | 2018 |
| Sahneh Sazi | Ali Hosseinzadeh | Ali Hosseinzadeh | Ali Hosseinzadeh | 2021 Orchestra Violin: Jamal Chalabiyani The latest music of Shahrum Kashani which was performed at his funeral in the United States |

== Videography ==
DVD Releases

- Khoshalam (included in the Khoshalam Album)

=== Taraneh Records ===
- Kheyli Vaghteh
