= Brass knuckles (disambiguation) =

Brass knuckles are a metal device worn on the fingers in a fight.

Brass knuckles may also refer to:

- Brass Knuckles (album), a 2008 album by Nelly
- Brass Knuckles (Pluto), an area on the planet Pluto
- Brass Knuckles (band), an electronic dance music trio
- Brass Knuckles (film), a 1927 silent crime film
