= African Bounce =

African Bounce may refer to:

- "African Bounce", song by Madlib from the 2010 album Madlib Medicine Show #3: Beat Konducta in Africa
- "African Bounce", song by Michael Fall from the 2013 album Turn On Your Radio
