= Brass Knuckles (band) =

American electronic dance music trio

- Origin: Miami, Florida
- Genre: Electronic Dance Music
- Years active: 2008 - present
- Label: Ultra
- Members: Danny D'Brito; Tony Livadas; Anthony Pisano
- Website: brassknucklesmusic.com

Brass Knuckles is an American electronic dance music trio originating from Miami, consisting of Danny D'Brito, Tony Livadas, and Anthony Pisano.

== Musical career ==
=== Formation ===
Danny and Tony originally played together in a band in the early 2000s before connecting with Anthony in 2009.

=== 2008-2012 ===
After producing music together for two years, including two song placements on Jagged Edge’s album which featured Rick Ross, they finally came together and created Brass Knuckles in 2010.

In 2011, the group released their single "Lie to You" on Nervous Records. Global touring followed the release, bringing them to Asia and Europe. This leg of touring included a variety of dates in Croatia, as well as an opening set in front of 10,000 people supporting genre legend Fatboy Slim.

In 2012, having attracted attention of major labels, they signed with Ultra Records and released their first single with them, "Bad Habits". "Bad Habits" peaked at #27 on Billboard Club Play Charts and #45 on Billboard Dance Charts, and was featured on Ultra Music 14 and Ultra/Wynn Presents XS Las Vegas Sessions: Vol. 2. At Ultra Music Festival 2013, well-known electronic groups Knife Party, Krewella and Adventure Club played “Bad Habits” in their live DJ sets in Miami; Knife Party playing it both weekends.

The music video for "Bad Habits", released in November 2012, sparked debate, as it included footage dealing with heavier issues such as drug usage and extreme violence. Vibe interviewed the trio later on, and revealed the background story behind the true message of the video.

=== 2013-present ===
Early in 2013, Brass Knuckles released "Hurricane", an additional Beatport exclusive peaking at No. 24 on the Electro/House Charts. Their next single "As Long As I’m Alive" and debut EP will be released on Ultra, due out in summer 2013.

2013 marked the third consecutive year that their party ' The Electric Circus' was held in Miami.

== Discography ==
=== Singles ===
- "Closure" (Brass Knuckles & David Solano) (2010)
- "Lie To You" (2011)
- "Bad Habits" (2012) #45 on Billboard Dance Charts and #27 on Billboard Club Play Charts
  - Remixed by:
    - DJ BL3ND
    - DotExe
    - David Solano and Leewise
    - Joe Maz of Discotech
    - Twinz Beatz
    - The Renegades
- "Hurricane" (Feat. Emir Duru) (2013) #24 on Beatport House Electro Tracks
- "As Long As I'm Alive" (Feat. John Ryan) (2013)
  - Remixed by:
    - Starkillers
    - Greg Cerrone

=== Upcoming releases ===
- "More Than One" (Feat. Kay) (2013)
- "Its Too Late" (Feat. Hayley Gene) (2013)
- "Sun Was Shining" (Feat. Jody Brock) (2013)

=== Remixes ===
- Cee Lo Green – "F*** You"
- Gotye – "Somebody That I Used To Know"
- Jason Derulo – "Other Side"
- Kimbra – "Posse"
- Le Youth – "Cool"
- Mt. Eden – "Airwalker"
- Carly Rae Jepsen - "This Kiss"
- Genesis – "Land of Confusion"
