= Peter Pou =

American singer-songwriter

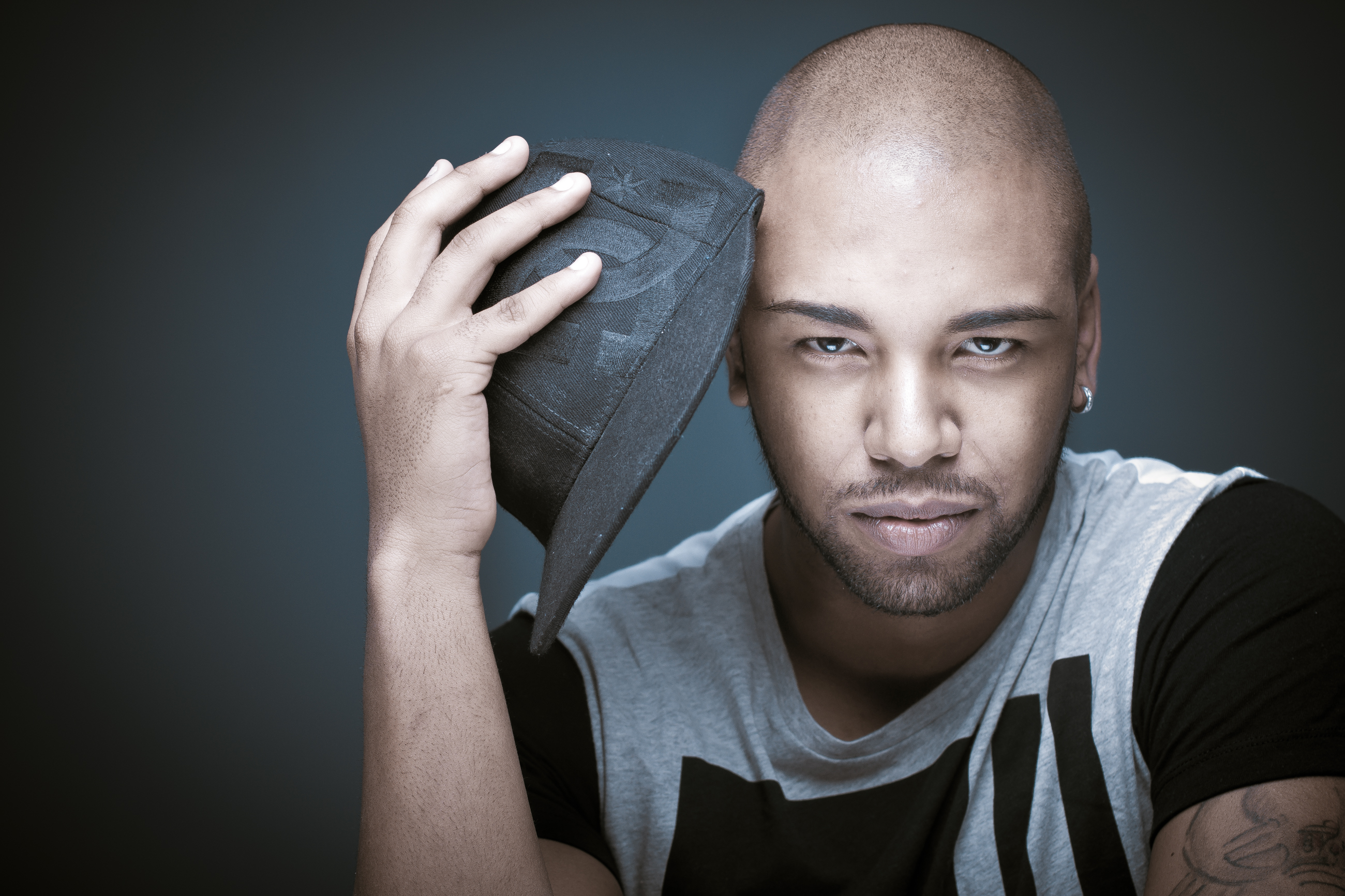
- Peter Pou

Background information
- Born: Pedro Juan Pou Hermoso; February 22, 1992 (age 33); Santo Domingo, Dominican Republic
- Genres: Dance, electro, house
- Occupation: Singer-songwriter
- Instrument: Vocals
- Years active: 2013–present
- Labels: Blanco y Negro Music
- Website: www.peterpou.com

Pedro Juan Pou Hermoso (born February 22, 1992), better known by his stage name Peter Pou, is a dance singer signed to the Spanish record label, Blanco y Negro Music.

== Musical career ==
Early in 2013, Peter Pou met the Spanish producer Daniel Ambrojo who decided to start a project together. At the age of 21, he started his musical career releasing "Invisible" featuring the Spanish singer Ethernity. In May of that same year, his second collaboration "Feeling Free" was released, this time featuring Oscar Martinez (DJ and broadcaster of Los 40 Principales radio station) which was performed by Peter Pou during its presentation in June.

At the beginning of September he released his third single "Can You Feel The Love" featuring DJ Valdi, who's worked as a DJ in several Spanish TV Shows such as El Hormiguero. The song became very successful in the Spanish dance radios, reaching number 4# on the Maxima FM 51 Chart in December 2013. It was included in the best dance compilations of the country such as: “I Like Fiesta 2013”, “Blanco & Negro DJ Series 2013, Vol. 7”, “Ahora 014”, “El gallo Máximo Compilation 2013, “40 Hot Mix”. The remixes of “Can You Feel The Love” will be out on March 11, 2014.

Peter Pou will release his first solo single "You Are My Sexy Girl" in spring 2014.

== Discography ==
=== Singles ===
- 2014: "You Are My Sexy Girl" [Blanco Y Negro Music]
- 2013: "Can You Feel The Love" (feat. DJ Valdi) [Blanco Y Negro Music]
- 2013: "Feeling Free" (feat. Oscar Martínez) [Clipper Sounds]
- 2013: "Invisible" (feat. Danza DJs & Ethernity) [Blanco Y Negro Music]

=== Remixes ===
- 2014: "You Are My Sexy Girl" (Extended Version) [Blanco Y Negro Music]
- 2014: "Can You Feel The Love" (feat. DJ Valdi) (Zakary Remix) [Blanco Y Negro Music]
- 2014: "Can You Feel The Love" (feat. DJ Valdi) (Submission DJ Remix) [Blanco Y Negro Music]
- 2014: "Can You Feel The Love" (feat. DJ Valdi) (Kato Jiménez & Jesús Sánchez Remix) [Blanco Y Negro Music]
- 2014: "Can You Feel The Love" (feat. DJ Valdi) (GioSer Hernandez & MPV Remix) [Blanco Y Negro Music]
- 2014: "Can You Feel The Love" (feat. DJ Valdi) (Geo Da Silva & Jack Mazzoni Remix) [Blanco Y Negro Music]
- 2014: "Can You Feel The Love" (feat. DJ Valdi) (Carlos Jean Remix) [Blanco Y Negro Music]
- 2013: "Can You Feel The Love" (feat. DJ Valdi) (Extended Version) [Blanco Y Negro Music]
- 2013: "Feeling Free" (The Zombie Kids Remix) (feat. Oscar Martínez) [Clipper Sounds]
- 2013: "Feeling Free" (Baccanali Djs Remix) (feat. Oscar Martínez) [Clipper Sounds]
- 2013: "Feeling Free" (Alex Guerrero Remix) (feat. Oscar Martínez) [Clipper Sounds]
- 2013: "Feeling Free" (Javi Torres Remix) (feat. Oscar Martínez) [Clipper Sounds]
- 2013: "Feeling Free" (Kike Puentes Remix) (feat. Oscar Martínez) [Clipper Sounds]

== See also ==
- Blanco y Negro Music
