= TOPradio =

Flemish radio station

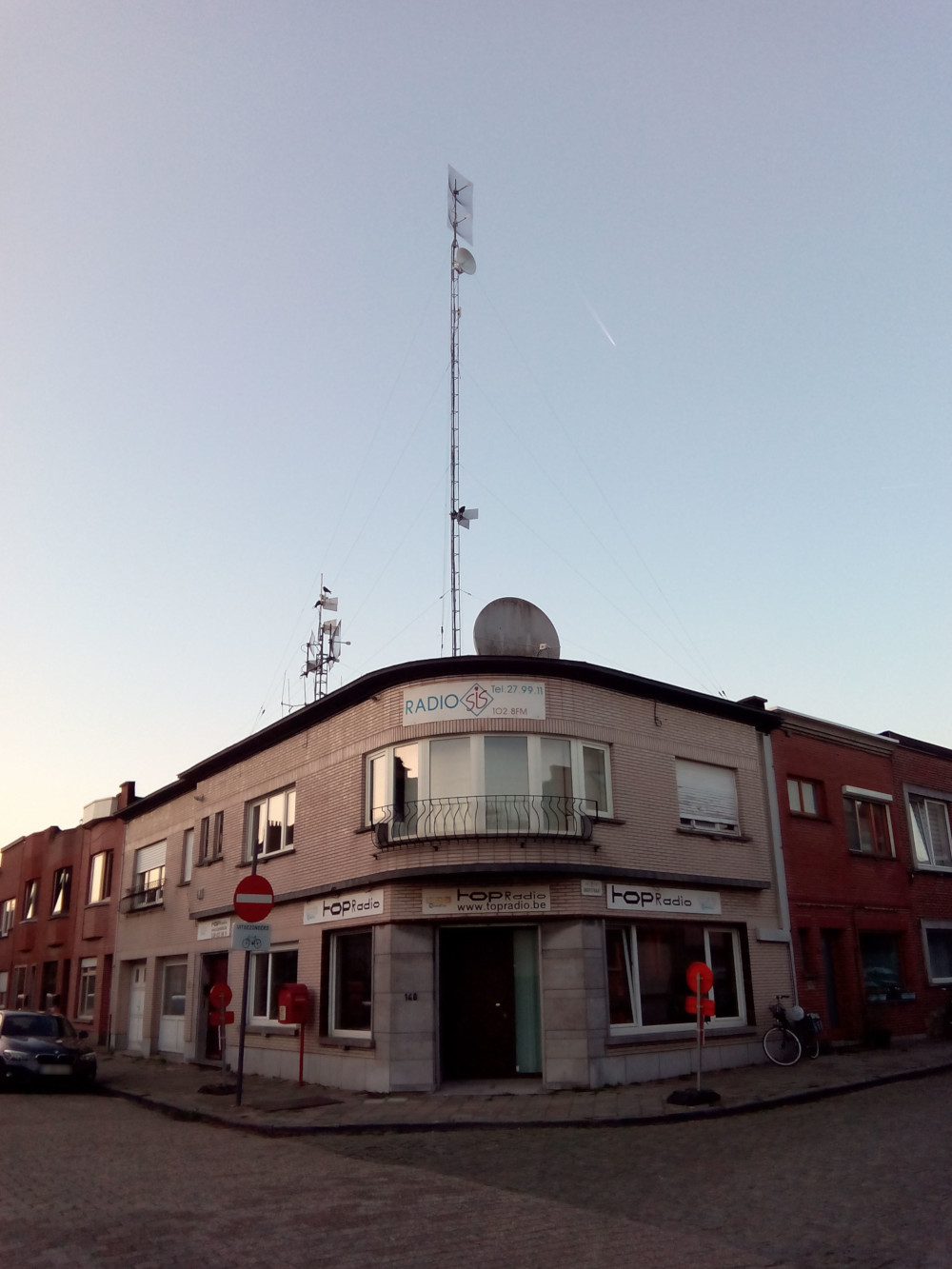
- The TOPradio studio in Ghent

History
- First air date: February 1982
- Former names: Radio One (1982–1987); Radio SIS (1987–1994); Dansradio Vlaanderen (1994–1996)

Links
- Website: topradio.be

TOPradio is a Belgian radio station that plays dance and dancepop music. The station broadcasts on FM and DAB across Flanders from studios located in Ghent.

== History ==
In mid-1981, four students from Ghent decided to launch an innovative radio concept. The new radio station aimed to focus on the age group from 15 to 35 years, and Flemish music was also forbidden. In February 1982 Ghent station launched under the name Radio One. Later, in 1987, a name change was implemented to Radio SIS.

In the frequency recognition round of 1990, Radio SIS was awarded a full frequency licence to broadcast every day on 102.8 MHz. The radio station identified by the further expansion a success in the region of Ghent. In 1994, a transmitter in Bruges and a transmitter from Kortrijk were added: from that moment, the three transmitters broadcast as Dansradio Vlaanderen ("Flanders Dance Radio").

In 1996 the name was changed to TOPradio. Two years later in 1998, a partnership was entered into with the VMMa, the current Medialaan. The holding company of television channel VTM and then Channel Two took over the production and distribution of the TOPradio programs. For example, the radio programs of TOPradio (including Land van Hoogland with Peter Hoogland) were broadcast live on TV at Channel Two, but in May 2003 it came to a split with the VMMa. VMMa had plans to rebrand TOPradio into JIMfm a new station with the same name of the TV-channel JIM, a radio station with a wider music format. However, this station never launched. TOPradio got a restart with programs for Flanders from the studios in Ghent. Through a network of lines, the signal is distributed to the various temporary locations, in 2015 the station also broadcast in DAB+.
