= Michael Fall =

Belgian DJ, producer, and remixer

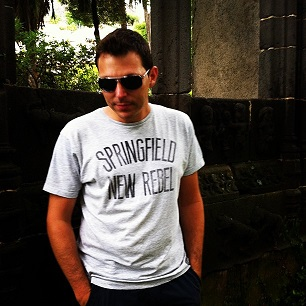

Background information
- Born: June 9, 1980 (age 46); Lokeren, Belgium
- Origin: Moerbeke-Waas, Belgium
- Genres: Dance, house, EDM, deep house
- Years active: 2009–present
- Labels: ZYX Music, CNR, Universal, Armada Music, Kontor, Blanco y Negro, MFrecords
- Website: http://www.michaelfall.be

Michael Fall (born June 9, 1980) is a Belgian DJ, producer, and remixer from Moerbeke-Waas, Belgium. He has had deals with labels including Universal Music Group, CNR Records in Belgium and ZYX Music in Germany. Several of his songs have charted in Belgium and other countries. In November 2012, he left his publishing deal with BMC Universal and moved to the Dutch publisher Strengholt Music Group, where he stayed until 2018. In 2013, he released his first album, Turn On Your Radio, which made the Belgian album chart. Fall owns the Belgian label MFrecords, and he ran a record shop in Zelzate until the end of 2020. In 2014, he received a gold award for the album. His second album, Ain't Nothing but a Party, came out on July 31, 2015. On August 28, 2020, his single "Winter" passed one million streams on Spotify. His third album, Million Years, was released by ZYX Music in April 2021.

== Biography ==
Fall's first single, "The Beach", came out in 2009 and spent a few weeks in the Belgian dance chart. He has since released many tracks under his own name. He also produced five tracks for Blend-it, a DJ and singer duo he was part of. He has also remixed songs by other artists and produced tracks for several of them.

In Belgium, Fall has played at clubs such as Riva (formerly Boccaccio), Kokorico and Club One. He has also played at festivals, including Beats of Summer in Blankenberge and Summer Carnival in Kortrijk, and at events abroad in Spain, Egypt, the Netherlands and England.

His songs have appeared on more than 100 CD compilations and many digital ones, released in countries including Belgium, Spain, Poland, Germany, the Netherlands, South Africa and Japan.

Larger labels he has worked with include Magic Records (Universal Poland), Universal Music Group Belgium and EMI Poland. Some of his tracks were licensed to the Dutch label Armada Music and the German label Kontor Records, and others to labels in Japan, the United States and South Africa.

He has released singles with the American rapper Fatman Scoop and the American singer Lumidee.

His songs have appeared in online charts such as Beatport, and several have entered the Belgian Ultratop charts.

In 2012, "La Bonita" (featuring Fatman Scoop) spent eight weeks in the German DJ chart (DDJC). In 2012 and 2013, other songs entered German, Swiss and British dance charts. "Body on Fire" reached No. 2 in the British Dance Chart and spent ten weeks in the Swiss Dance Chart. "She's All I Need" and "Good Times" also made the Swiss Dance Chart.

His first album, Turn On Your Radio, came out in 2013. Its title track had already reached the Belgian dance charts in 2012.

His second album, Ain't Nothing but a Party, followed in 2015. Three of its tracks entered the Belgian dance chart: "Find a Way" (eight weeks), "Go Deeper" (four weeks) and "Let Me Go".

In April 2015, the deep house track "Go Deeper" reached No. 11 in Beatport's Nu Disco chart. It was released on iTunes on May 15, 2015. "Let Me Go" peaked at No. 32 in the Belgian Ultratop Dance 50 chart in early 2016.

In 2020, he signed a two-album deal with the German label ZYX Music. The first of these, Million Years, came out in 2021.

In late 2023, he released an EP, Lost Tracks & Demos, and the single "Before We Get Old" with Maori.

In 2024, "Body on Fire" was used in episode 8 of the second season of the Australian comedy series Colin from Accounts. The song was written in 2013 by Celeste Newman, Fall and Mark Crocker. Also in 2024, he released "Like a Waterfall" with DJ Wout of Sylver and "Bubblegum" with Pat Krimson of 2 Fabiola.

== Charting singles in Belgium ==
Single(s) charting in Flanders (Vlaanderen) Ultratip 30	Date release	Date entry	Highest position	Number of weeks	Notes
The Beach (Michael Fall feat. DJ Falcon)	2009	20-06-2009	11	4	
Through your soul (Michael Fall feat. DJ Falcon)	2009	24-10-2009	21	3	
Drop the Beats (Michael Fall)	2010	23-02-2010	23	2	
Tell me how you feel (Blend-it)	2010	01-01-2011	37	3	
Love (Blend-it)	2011	23-07-2011	40	2	
This is the game (Crazy Sir-G)	2013	06-07-2013	56	3	

Single(s) charting in in the Flanders (Vlaanderen) Ultratip 100	Date release	Date entry	Highest position	Number of weeks	Notes
Buy Or Die (Michael Fall)	2014	08-11-2014	77	3	
Find a way (Michael Fall)	2015	02-05-2015	52	5	
Go Deeper (Luca Debonaire & Michael Fall feat. Jodie Topp)	2015	12-09-2015	56	4	
Let me go (Michael Fall)	2015	19-12-2015	48	2	

Single(s) charting in in the Flanders Ultratip Bubbling Under	Date release	Date entry	Highest position	Number of weeks	Notes
Let me go (Michael Fall)	2016	02-01-2016	36	5	
Winter (Michael Fall & Charlie Atom feat. Joe Bateman)	2016	16-07-2016	-	4	
Take Me Back (Michael Fall feat. Celeste)	2020	28-11-2020	-	4	

Single(s) charting in in the Flanders Ultratop Dance Bubbling Under	Date release	Date entry	Highest position	Number of weeks	Notes
Love (Blend-it)	2011	16-07-2011	1	3	
Dreamworld (Blend-it)	2011	07-01-2012	15	1	
Turn on your radio (Michael Fall)	2012	28-01-2012	5	2	
This is the game (Crazy Sir-G)	2013	20-07-2013	17	1	
Buy or die (Michael Fall)	2014	08-11-2014	8	3	
Find a way (Michael Fall)	2015	28-03-2015	1	8	
Go Deeper (Luca Debonaire & Michael Fall Feat. Jodie Topp)	2015	05-09-2015	1	4	
Let me go (Michael Fall)	2015	05-12-2015	8	2	
Tell me something (Michael Fall)	2016	09-04-2016	19	2	
Pardon me (Michael Fall)	2016	25-06-2016	17	1	
Winter (Michael Fall & Charlie Atom feat. Joe Bateman)	2016	23-07-2016	1	5	
Today (Michael Fall & Charlie Atom feat. Emma Harrop)	2017	29-04-2017	15	1	

Single(s) charting in in the Flanders Ultratop 50 Dance	Date Release	Date entry	Highest position	Number of weeks	Notes
Turn on your radio (Michael Fall)	2012	11-02-2012	49	2	
Find a way (Michael Fall)	2015	06-06-2015	50	1	
Go Deeper (Luca Debonaire & Michael Fall Feat. Jodie Topp)	2015	03-10-2015	42	4	
Let me go (Michael Fall)	2015	19-12-2015	32	7	
Winter (Charlie Atom & Michael Fall Feat. Joe Bateman)	2016	27-08-2016	41	1	

Single(s) charting in in the Flanders Ultratop 50	Date Release	Date entry	Highest position	Number of weeks	Notes
Buy Or Die (Michael Fall)	2014	01-11-2014	58	4	

== Charting singles in other countries ==
Single(s) charting in Germany DDJC (Deutsche Dj Charts)	Date release	Date entry	Highest position	Number of weeks	Notes
La Bonita (Michael Fall & Dj J Nice Feat. Fatman Scoop)	2012	11-06-2012	43	8	
Let Me Go (Michael Fall)	2015	31-08-2015	68	4	
Ain't Nothing but a party (Michael Fall Feat. Chappell)	2016	15-08-2016	62	3	
Million Years (Michael Fall)	2019	07-01-2019	24	8	
On&On (Michael Fall)	2020	02-11-2020	65	2	

Single(s) charting in Beatport Indie Dance/Nu Disco	Date release	Date highest position	Highest position	Number of weeks	Notes
Go Deeper (Luca Debonaire & Michael Fall feat. Jodie Topp)	2015	15-04-2015	11	-	
Work for this (Luca Debonaire & Michael Fall feat. Jodie Topp)	2015	27-09-2015	15	-	
Let Me Go (Michael Fall)	2015	04-11-2015	81	-	

Single(s) charting in Switzerland/Austria Swiss Dance Chart	Date release	Date entry	Highest position	Number of weeks	Notes
Good Times (Michael Fall Feat. Stephen Pickup)	2012	21-01-2013	85	10	
She's all I Need (Michael Fall Feat. Barry Tone)	2013	19-08-2013	20	9	
Body on Fire (Michael Fall Feat. Celeste)	2013	12-08-2013	29	10	
Pleasure Seekers (Michael Fall)	2013	22-11-2013	28	10	
Threshold (When You Touch Me There (Michael Fall Feat. Celeste)	2015	30-01-2015	15	10	
Million Years (Michael Fall)	2019	15-02-2019	47	10	
On&On (Michael Fall Feat. Terrace)	2020	06-11-2020	8	10	
I'm In Love (Michael Fall)	2021	04-05-2021	10	10	

Single(s) charting in UK British Dance Chart	Date release	Date entry	Highest position	Number of weeks	Notes
Body on Fire (Michael Fall Feat. Celeste)	2013	22-07-2013	2	6	
Barra Grande(Michael Fall)	2014	03-03-2014	1	6	

== Charting albums ==
Album charting in in the Flanders [Ultratop]] 200 Albums	Date Release	Date entry	Highest position	Number of weeks	Notes
Turn on your radio (Michael Fall)	30-06-2013	13-07-2013	107	2	

Album charting in in the Flanders Top 40 Belgian Albums	Date Release	Date entry	Highest position	Number of weeks	Notes
Turn on your radio (Michael Fall)	30-06-2013	13-07-2013	27	2	

== Discography (singles) ==
Single(s)	Date of release	Label	Notes
The Beach (featuring Dj Falcon)	2009	La Musique Du Beau Monde (BE)	
Through Your Soul (featuring Dj Falcon)	2009	La Musique Du Beau Monde (BE)	
Not the Time (featuring ara)	2009	La Musique Du Beau Monde (BE)	
Drop the Beats	2010	La Musique Du Beau Monde (BE)	
Big brown eyes (featuring Gene Pole)	2010	La Musique Du Beau Monde (BE)	
Mine (featuring Miranda)	2010	La Musique Du Beau Monde (BE)	
Tell Me How You Feel (Blend-it)	2010	BIP Records (BE)	
Unforgettable (vs. DJ Fred feat. Elton Jonathan)	2011	La Musique Du Beau Monde (BE)	
Love (Blend-it)	2011	BIP Records (BE)	
Dreamworld (Blend-it)	2011	BIP Records (BE)	
Turn On Your Radio	2012	Mostiko CNR/ Armada Zouk (BE)	
Edge of the World (& Nils Van Zandt featuring Drew Darcy	2012	Mostiko (BE)	
La Bonita (Michael Fall & Dj J Nice featuring Fatman Scoop	2012	Mostiko (BE)	
Together	2012	Jackers Revenge Records (NL)	
In the Rhythm	2012	Interlabel (Nu Deep) (DE)	
Once again	2012	Jackers Revenge Records (NL)	
Out of control (Blend-It feat. Nagi)	2011	BIP Records (BE)	
People/keep on (Deejay Fred) (Michael Fall mixes)	2012	NumberOneBeats Records (DE)/MF-Records (BE)	
Ghettoblaster	2012	NumberOneBeats Records (DE)	
Hypnotised	2012	Beatcanteen (USA)	
Drop it low (Mega Open Air Anthem 2012)	2012	MF-Records (BE)	
Ready for the Good Times (Vs. Clerx & Van Dijk feat. Brian)	2012	NumberOneBeats Records (DE)	
Good Times (Feat. Stephen Pickup)	2012	DMN Records (DE)	
Don't you want my lovin	2012	Let's Play Records! (NL)	
You take my breath away (Feat. Jay Martin)	2012	Squad Music (ES)	
Vixen (Feat. the Sunseekers)	2012	Sounds United (DE)	
One Touch (vs. DJ Diablo feat. Drew Darcy)	2012	NumberOneBeats Records (DE)	
Save me (Blend-it Feat. Jo Angel)	2012	BIP Records (BE)	
Rock & and Roll (DJ farre Feat. Mel Jade) (Michael Fall mixes)	2012	Squad Music (ES)	
The Feeling(Let me go)	2012	Let's Play Records! (NL)	
Put your hands up	2013	Squad Music (ES)	
She's all I Need(Feat. Barry Tone)	2013	DMN records! (DE)	
African Bounce	2013	NumberOneBeats Records (DE)	
Body on Fire (Feat. Celeste)	2013	DMN records (DE)	
Pleasure Seekers (Kick The Bass)	2013	NumberOneBeats Records (DE)	
Barra Grande	2013	Zyx (DE)	
Ring My Bell (Michael Fall featuring Lumidee, Rick Elback & Aziza)	2014	Universal Australia/Sony Scandinavia	
Baltazar	2013/2014	Zyx (DE)	
Treshold	2014	Zyx (DE)	
Treshold (When you touch me there) (Feat. Celeste	2014	Zyx (DE)	
It's gonna be all right	2014	Squad Music (ES)	
Buy or die	2014	Jeffrecords (FR) / Universal (BE)	
Find a way	2015	MFrecords (BE)	
Go Deeper (& Luca Debonaire Feat. Jodie)	2015	Hi-Bias (CA)	
Infatuation (Feat. Tyler Traxx)	2015	Jango (FR)	
Let me go	2015	Zyx (DE)	
Work for this (& Luca Debonaire Feat. Jodie)	2015	Hi-Bias (CA)	
Tell me something	2016	MFrecords (BE)	
Pardon Me	2016	MFrecords (BE)	
Ain't nothing but a party (featuring Chappell) (Single from Album release)	2016	Zyx (DE)	
Winter (& Charlie Atom featuring Joe Bateman)	2016	Blanco Y Negro (ES)	
Drifting away	2016	MFrecords (BE) / Zyx (GSA) / Squad music(ES)	
Today (& Charlie Atom featuring Emma Harrop)	2017	Blanco Y Negro (ES)	
Throwin' it out (& Luca Debonaire)	2017	Blanco Y Negro (ES)	
Gone (& Charlie Atom featuring Drew Darcy)	2017	Zyx (DE) / MFrecords (BE) /Planeta Mix Records (ES	
Stars	2017	MFrecords (BE) / Zyx (GSA) / Planeta Mix Records (ES)	
You mean the world to me (& Luxx Daze)	2018	MFrecords (BE)	
Talk to me (& Luxx Daze)	2018	MFrecords (BE)	
Sunshine (Feat. Jodie)	2018	Planeta Mix Records (ES)	
Jammin' (& Charlie Atom)	2018	Planeta Mix Records (ES)	
Million Years	2019	Zyx (DE)	
Nothing Really Matters	2019	MFrecords (BE)	
On&On Feat. Terrace	2020	Zyx Records (DE)	
Take me back Feat. Celeste	2020	Zyx Records (DE)	
Roll The Dice Feat. Oniva	2020	Zyx Records (DE)	
I'm In Love	2021	Zyx Records (DE)	
Can't Get Enough	2021	Zyx Records (DE)	
Behind Me	2021	Zyx Records (DE)	
My Mind (& Bass leuwenberg)	2022	Zyx Records (DE)	
La La Love (The Secret & The Key)	2022	Bip Records (BE)	
Before we get old (& Maori)	2023	Blanco Y Negro (ES)	
Like a waterfall (& Dj Wout)	2024	MFrecords (BE)	
Best you ever had (feat. lady E)	2024	Zyx Records (DE)	
Bubblegum (& Pat Krimson)	2024	MFrecords (BE)	
Dominique	2025	Bip Records (BE)	
Out Of Reach	2025	TBA (BE)	
Work(Folk)(& Charlie Atom)	2026	Zyx Record (DE)	

== Official remixes on the charts ==
Singles Flanders Ultratip 30	Release date	Entry date	Peak position	Notes
Forever in a Day, Taylor Jones (Michael Fall Remix)	2013	31 August 2013	35	

Singles Flanders Ultratop Dance Bubbling Under (Vlaanderen)	Release date	Entry date	Peak position	Notes
Move On, Tonski & JMA featuring Jonny Rose (Michael Fall Remix)	2016	05 August 2016	7	

== Productions Collaborations ==
Single(s)	Date of release	Label	Notes
This is the game (Crazy Sir-G)	2013	Mostiko (BE)	
Love Is On The Dancefloor (Brihans)	2013	Dmn Records (DE)	
Losing My Halo (Dj Farre Feat. Jo Angel)	2013	Squad music (ES)	

== Official Remixes ==
Official Remixes	Date of release	Label	Notes
U Sure Do (Michael Fall Remix) - Damon Blaze	2012	Bip (BE)	
I Love You (Michael Fall Remix) - Damon Blaze Feat. Brian	2012	Bip (BE)	
Feel It In My Heart (Michael Fall Remix) - Dj Maxx Fiesta Vs Tony T	2013	DMN (DE)	
Know Right Now (Michael Fall Remix) - Miss Autumn Leaves	2013	Made2Dance Records (NL)	
Summer (Michael Fall Remix) - Lavika	2014	Zyx (DE)	
The Message 2k14 (Michael Fall Remix) - Tale & Dutch Feat. Bart Reeves)	2014	Big Beef (DE)	
El Diablo 2k14 (Michael Fall Remix) - Fuego	2014	Zyx (DE)	
#Heroes (Michael Fall Remix) - T-Moor Rodriguez	2014	Zyx (DE)	
B Bang Bang (Michael Fall Remix) - Fun Factory	2014	Zyx (DE)	
Strong Together (Michael Fall Remix) - Linda Jo Rizzo Feat. Fancy	2014	Zyx (DE)	
Moonlight Shadow 2k14 (Michael Fall Remix) - Maggie Reilly	2014	Zyx (DE)	
Move on (Michael Fall Remix) - Tonski & JMA Feat. Johnny Rose	2016	Judi Records (BE)	
More to love (Michael Fall Remix) - Volcano Project Feat.Linda Jo Rizzo	2017	Zyx (DE)	
Dubpower (Michael Fall Remix) - Watts & Wilde	2017	Beatimplant (BE)	
I came to fall in love (Michael Fall Remix) - Brandon Laze Feat. Alius	2018	TBC (TBC)	

=== CD compilations ===
- 2009 TopRequest Summermix (Mostiko CNR Records) "The Beach"
- 2009 TopRadio The Partystation (Mostiko CNR Records) "The Beach"
- 2010 ClubVibes 2010-01 (Mostiko CNR Records) "Drop The Beats"
- 2010 Popcorn Hits Zima 2010 (EMI Music) "The Beach"
- 2011 Mindblowing (MME Dance Division) "Love" (by Blend-It)
- 2012 VT4 Summervibes 2012 (News Records) "La Bonita"
- 2012 Ibiza 2012 - The Finest House Collection (Kontor Records) "In The Rhythm"
- 2012 Tche Tcherere Tche Tche (Universal Music) "La Bonita"
- 2012 Ibiza Top 100 (Cloud 9 /Armada Music) "Turn On Your Radio"
- 2013 Disco House 2013 (Zyx) "Vixen"
- 2014 Club Sounds Vol. 68 (Sony Music) "Ring My Bell" Feat. Lumidee
- 2014 Club Summer 2014 (PolyStar/ Universal Music)"Buy Or Die"
- 2014 Urban Dance Vol. 16 (Warner Music) "Ring My Bell" Feat. Lumidee
- 2015 EDM 2015 (Zyx) "Treshold" (Festival Mix)
- 2015 Serious Beats 82 (News Records) "Go Deeper"
- 2015 EDM Anthems (Zyx) "Stronger Together" (Michael Fall Radio Remix)
- 2016 Summertime (Blanco y Negro Music) "Winter"
- 2016 Deep & House Ibiza (Vendetta Records) "Winter"
- 2016 I Like Fiesta 2016 (Blanco y Negro Music) "Winter"
- 2016 Deep & Future House (ZYX Music) "Let Me Go/Dream of you"
- 2016 Blanco y Negro Dj Culture Vol.6 (Blanco y Negro Music) "Winter"
- 2017 Apres Ski Dance Hits (ZYX Music) "(treshold) When You Touch Me There"
- 2017 Disco House (ZYX Music) "Let Me Go" "She's all I need"
- 2017 Club Trax: This Is Deep Vol. 1 (ZYX Music) "More To Love (Michael Fall Remix)" "Drifting Away"
- 2017 #Musicote Vol. 2 (Blanco y Negro Music) "Today"
- 2017 Blanco y Negro Dj Culture Vol.17 (Blanco y Negro Music) "Today"
- 2017 Playa Hits 2017 (Squad Music) "Drifting Away"
- 2017 Blanco y Negro Dj Culture Vol.20 (Blanco y Negro Music) "Throwin' It Out"
- 2017 Deep & House Ibiza 2 (Vendetta Records) "Throwin' It Out"
- 2017 Ahora 017 (Blanco y Negro Music) "Throwin' It Out"
- 2018 The best of Disco House (Zyx) "Stronger Together(Michael Fall Remix)"
- 2018 This is EDM (Zyx) "Ain't Nothing But A Party"
- 2018 EDM Classics (Zyx) "Treshold"
- 2018 Party Pop Hits (Zyx) "Ain't Nothing but a party" (Feat.Chappel)
- 2018 Décimo Anniversario (Squad Music) "Drifting Away" "You take my breath away" & "Find a way"
- 2019 Deephouse 2019 (Zyx) "Million Years"
- 2019 Festival Season Vol.1 (Zyx) "Million Years"
- 2019 Just Happy (Zyx) "Million Years"
- 2019 Ibiza World Club Tour Vol. 4 (Zyx) "Million Years"
- 2019 Festival Traxx (Zyx) "Million Years"
- 2020 Ibiza Summer Groove (Zyx) "Million Years"
- 2021 EDM Mainfloor (Zyx) "Stars"
- 2022 Hard Base FM 11 (Zyx) "Million Years"
- 2023 Techno Base FM 36 (Zyx) "Million Years"

=== Vinyl Release ===
- July 2009 Groovy's Sampler (Groovy Records) "Incl. The Beach"
- July 2025 Like a Waterfall/Bubblegum EP (MFrecords), with mixes by DJ Wout, Pat Krimson and Christopher Phonk

== Turn On Your Radio (2013) ==
No.	Title	Length
1.	"Turn on your radio" (Michael Fall)
2.	"One Touch" (Michael Fall feat. Drew Darcy)
3.	"Ready for the good times" (Michael Fall & Clerq & Van Dijck feat. Brian)
4.	"She's the one" (Michael Fall feat. Drew Darcy)
5.	"African Bounce" (Michael Fall)
6.	"Together" (Michael Fall)
7.	"Once Again" (Michael Fall)
8.	"Don't you want my lovin'" (Michael Fall)
9.	"Touch" (Michael Fall Drew Darcy)
10.	"The Feeling" (Michael Fall & Luxx Daze)
11.	"Drop it low" (Michael Fall)
12.	"Leave her she's fake" (Michael Fall)
13.	"Vixen" (Michael Fall feat.The Sunseekers)
14.	"She's all i need" (Michael Fall feat.Barry Tone)
15.	"Good times" (Michael Fall feat.Stephen Pickup)
16.	"La Bonita" (Michael Fall & Dj J Nice Feat. Fatman Scoop)
17.	"Edge of the world" (Michael Fall & Nils Van Zandt feat, Drew Darcy)
18.	"Ghettoblaster" (Michael Fall)
19.	"Perfumed garden" (Michael Fall)

== Ain't Nothing but a Party (2015) ==
No.	Title	Length
1.	"It's Gonna Be All Right (Radio Vocal Version)" (Michael Fall feat. Tyler Traxx)	3:54
2.	"Ring My Bell (Michael Fall Radio Edit)" (Michael Fall feat. Lumidee, R. Ellback & Aziza)	3:21
3.	"Ain't Nothing But A Party (Radio Edit)" (Michael Fall feat. Chappell)	3:33
4.	"Baltazar (Radio Edit)" (Michael Fall)	4:06
5.	"Dark Side Of The Sun (Radio Edit)" (Michael Fall feat. Drew Darcy)	4:07
6.	"Treshold (When You Touch Me There) (Radio Edit)" (Michael Fall feat. Celeste)	4:07
7.	"Let Me Go (Radio Edit)" (Michael Fall)	3:00
8.	"Straight From The Heart (Radio Edit)" (Michael Fall)	3:26
9.	"Body On Fire (Radio Mix)" (Michael Fall feat. Celeste)	3:17
10.	"Someone (Radio Mix)" (Michael Fall & Luxx Daze)	3:17
11.	"Avalanche (Radio Edit)" (Michael Fall feat. Drew Darcy)	3:37
12.	"Ready For Tonight (Radio Edit)" (Michael Fall feat. Phaell)	3:37
13.	"Infatuation (Deep Mix)" (Michael Fall ft. Tyler Traxx)	5:52
14.	"Find A Way (Radio Edit)" (Michael Fall)	3:20
15.	"Dangerous (Radio Edit)" (Michael Fall & Victor Milas feat. Jerry Given)	2:54
16.	"Celebrate Tonight (Radio Edit)" (Michael Fall & Low Frequency)	3:31
17.	"Barra Grande (Radio Edit)" (Michael Fall)	3:26
18.	"Dream Of You (Radio Edit)" (Michael Fall)	3:40
19.	"Go Deeper (Radio Edit)" (Michael Fall & Luca Debonaire feat. Jodie Topp)	4:00

No.	Title	Length
1.	"Summer (Michael Fall Extended Remix)" (Lavika)	5:32
2.	"Moonlight Shadow 2k14 (Michael Fall Extended Remix)" (Maggie Reilly)	5:56
3.	"Heroes (Michael Fall Extended Remix)" (T-Moor Rodriguez)	5:34
4.	"The Message (Reload) (Michael Fall Remix)" (Tale & Dutch feat. Bart Reeves)	6:00
5.	"Stronger Together (Michael Fall Extended Remix)" (Linda Jo Rizzo ft. Fancy)	5:25
6.	"El Diablo 2k14 (Michael Fall Bigroom Remix)" (Fuego)	5:39
7.	"Feel It In My Heart (Michael Fall Remix)" (DJ Maxx Fiesta vs. Tony T)	5:05
8.	"Rock and Roll (Michael Fall Club Mix)" (DJ Farre feat. Mel Jade)	4:49
9.	"Know Right Now (Michael Fall Remix)" (Miss Autumn Leaves)	4:41
10.	"I'm No More Impressed (Michael Fall Extended Remix)" (Deadstar feat. Manu)	5:33
11.	"B'Bang Bang (Michael Fall Extended Remix)" (Fun Factory)	5:27
12.	"Ivory Tower (Michael Fall Blend-It Remix)" (Secret Wish)	6:21
13.	"Losing My Halo (Michael Fall Extended Club Mix)" (DJ Farre feat. Jo Angel)	5:31

== Million Years (2021) ==
No.	Title	Length
1.	"Million Years" (Michael Fall)	2:45
2.	"On&On Feat. Terrace" (Michael Fall)	3:18
3.	"Take Me Back Feat. Celeste" (Michael Fall)	2:50
4.	"Can't Get Enough" (Michael Fall)	2:48
5.	"Roll The Dice Feat. Oniva" (Michael Fall)	3:15
6.	"I'm In Love" (Michael Fall)	3:14
7.	"Breathe Feat. Oniva" (Michael Fall)	3:03
8.	"Behind Me" (Michael Fall)	3:09
9.	"Nothing really Matters" (Michael Fall feat.)	5:09
10.	"You Mean the World To Me" (Michael Fall & Luxx Daze)	3:32
11.	"Talk To Me" (Michael Fall & Luxx Daze)	3:22
12.	"Pardon Me" (Michael Fall)	6:35
13.	"Tell Me Something" (Michael Fall)	3:31
