= Joe Maz =

American record producer and DJ

Joseph Masurka (born September 29) better known as Joe Maz, is a producer & DJ. Joe Maz has produced official remixes for Adele, Coldplay & Beyoncé, Kanye West, Major Lazer & Dua Lipa and Flo Rida. In 2022, Maz's remix of Masked Wolf - Astronaut in the Ocean was voted #1 of the year at the Electronic Dance Music Awards, he was also nominated for Remixer of the Year. In 2017, he was voted Remixer of the Year at Summer Sessions in Atlantic City, with Nile Rodgers presenting the award. In 2018, he was again nominated for Remixer of the Year at Summer Session In 2019, Joe won Remix of the Year in the rap category at the Remix Awards in Miami

== History ==
Prior to launching his solo career, Joe was also involved in two other collaborative projects, DiscoTech and Señor Stereo, both alongside DJ's Danny Daze and Gigamesh.

In 2008, he joined DJ AM's agency Deckstar.

== Musical career ==
In 2016, his single "No Good" reached #14 on the Billboard Dance Chart and he joined the Billboard panel as a reporting member.

Joe's music has been played in DJ sets of Jack Ü, Diplo, Afrojack, and Hardwell. His remix of Major Lazer's "Cold Water" received over 1.5 million plays on SoundCloud.

Joe Maz has several #1 ranked remixes in the United States including "Bad Guy" by Billie Eilish, "Sweet But Psycho" by Ava Max, "Unforttable" by French Montana, "Starboy" by The Weeknd ft. Daft Punk, "Cold Water" by Major Lazer ft. Justin Bieber, and "Roses" by The Chainsmokers.

== Discography ==
=== Singles ===
Year	Title	Label
2016	"No Good" featuring Scotty Boy & Krista Richards	Casa Rossa
2016	"Horns" featuring DiscoTech	Pyro Records
2016	"Together" featuring Adam Foster	LoveStyle
2016	"Stomp To My Beat" featuring DiscoTech	Self Released

=== Remixes ===
Year	Song	Artist
2022	Sweet Dreams	Eurythmics
2022	First Class	Jack Harlow
2022	Pursuit of Happiness	Kid Cudi
2022	Sacrifice	The Weeknd
2022	Pursuit of Happiness	Kid Cudi
2021	Do It To It	ACRAZE
2021	Life Goes On	Oliver Tree
2021	Love Tonight	Shouse
2021	Business	Tiesto
2020	Roses	Saint Jhn
2020	Ego Death	Ty Dolla Sign, Kanye, Skrillex
2019	Bad Guy	Billie Eilish
2019	Electricity	Silk City ft Dua Lipa
2019	MIA	Bad Bunny Ft Drake
2019	Without Me	Halsey
2019	Psycho	Ava Max
2019	High Hopes	Panic at the Disco
2018	Sicko Mode	Travis Scott ft Drake
2018	Taki Taki	DJ Snake ft Ozuna, Cardi B & Selena Gomez
2018	Curious	Hayley Kiyoko
2018	Rockstar	Post Malone
2018	God's Plan	Drake
2017	All Falls Down	Alan Walker featuring Noah Cyrus
2017	I Miss You	Clean Bandit
2017	Better On Me	Pitbull featuring Ty Dolla Sign
2017	Goosebumps	Travis Scott
2017	My Love	Wale featuring Major Lazer
2017	Symphony	Clean Bandit featuring Zara Larssen
2017	Chained To The Rhythm	Katy Perry featuring Skip Marley
2017	Burn Brighter	Pavlova
2017	Come First	Terror Jr
2017	Shape Of You	Ed Sheeran
2016	Starboy	The Weeknd featuring Daft Punk
2016	Gold	Kiiara
2016	Broccoli	DRAM featuring Lil Yachty
2016	Heathens	Twenty One Pilots
2016	Cry (DiscoTech & A-Trak Remix)	Bingo Players
2016	Cold Water	Major Lazer featuring Justin Bieber
2016	No Money	Galantis
2016	Hymn For The Weekend	Coldplay featuring Beyonce
2016	The Girl Is Mine (DiscoTech Remix)	99 Souls
2015	When We Were Young (DiscoTech Remix)	Adele
2015	Roses	The Chainsmokers
2015	Heads Will Roll (DiscoTech Remix)	Yeah Yeah Yeahs
2015	Lean On (DiscoTech Remix)	Major Lazer
2014	Take Me To Church	Hozier
2014	2 On (DiscoTech Remix)	Tinashe
2014	Hideaway (DiscoTech Remix)	Kiesza
2014	Rather Be (DiscoTech Remix)	Clean Bandit
2013	Daylight	Maroon 5
2013	Sail	Awolnation
2013	Bad Habits	Brass Knuckles
2013	Da Funk	Daft Punk
2009	3 (DiscoTech Remix)	Britney Spears
