= Blanco y Negro Music =

Spanish record label

- Founded: 1978
- Genre: Dance music
- Country of origin: Spain
- Official website: blancoynegro.com

Blanco y Negro Music (for short Blanco y Negro, English translation "Black and White") is a Spanish record label which was founded in 1978. It is one of the leading dance music record companies in Spain. On January 17, 1983, Blanco y Negro Music became a record label, founded by Félix Buget. It is considered by the media as the pioneer of EDM in Spain.

The company also specializes in film and video productions. It has presented artists such as Pitbull, Shaggy, DJ BoBo, SASH! and Guru Josh.

Blanco y Negro Music is a partner of the enterprise Pulsive Media in Burgwedel, Germany.

== See also ==
- List of record labels
- Peter Pou
