= List of national parks and protected areas of Iran =

This is a list of the national parks, protected areas, and wildlife refuges, of Iran.

== Listings ==
There are around 200 protected areas in Iran to preserve the biodiversity of the country. As many as 16 national parks among them are home to a plethora of species. Golestan National Park, Kavir National Park, Turan National Park, and Tandoureh National Park are among the top protected areas. Each of these parks encompasses varieties of flora and fauna in their wild frontiers. Notice that all National Parks of Iran are safe to visit but you need a permit to enter any of the National Parks and it's best to take a tour leader or a ranger to get close to any of the wild animals you like to see. The complete national parks, protected areas, and wildlife refuges in Iran include:

=== National parks ===
- Bakhtegan National Park
- Bamu National Park – near Shiraz
- Bojagh National Park
- Dayer-Nakhiloo National Park
- Dena National Park and Protected Area
- Ghamishloo National Park
- Ghatroyeh National Park
- Golestan National Park
- Kavir National Park
- Khabr National Park – near Kerman
- Khar Turan National Park
- Kiasar National Park
- Kolahghazi National Park
- Lake Urmia National Park
- Lar National Park
- Naybandan Wildlife Refuge
- Paband National Park
- Salouk National Park
- Sarigol National Park
- Siyahkooh National Park
- Sorkheh Hesar National Park
- Tandooreh National Park
- Tang-e Sayad National Park

=== Protected areas ===
- Alvand Protected Area
- Arasbaran Protected Area
- Arjan Protected Area
- Bafq Protected Area
- Baloot Boland Protected Area, near Daryas and Dehdez in Khuzestan along the Karun River
- Bisotun Protected Area, north of Kermanshah
- Central Alborz Protected Area
- Dehdez Protected Area, near Ghaleh Sard (northwest of Dehdez) north of the Karun River
- Dena Protected Area
- Dinar Kouh Protected Area – Ilam province
- Haftad Goleh Protected Area, east of Arak, Iran
- Hamoon Wetlands – Hamun-i-Helmand
- Hara Protected Area
- Haraz Protected Area
- Heleh Protected Area, south of Berenjgan
- Gando Protected Area
- Geno Protected Area
- Ghalajeh Protected Area
- Kabir Kouh Protected Area – Ilam province
- Karkas Protected Area
- Karkheh Protected Area
- Kavir Protected Area
- Koulak Protected Area – Ilam province
- Kuh-e-Dil Protected Area
- Lake of Ghosts – near Vanush
- Lar Protected Area
- Manesht & Ghelarang Protected Area – Ilam province
- Mianjangal Protected Area
- Miankaleh Protected Area
- Mozaffari Protected Area
- Oshtoran Mountain Protected Area (Oshtran Kuh Protected Area?)
- Sheyvand Protected Area, near Sheyvand in Khuzestan southwest along the Karun River
- Shaloo & Mongasht Protected Area, southwest along the Karun River
- Shimbar and Lake Area of Karun Dam Protected Area
- Siahkeshim Protected Area
- Siahroud Roudbar Protected Area
- Touran Protected Area
- Nazhvan Suburban Natural Park – near Isfahan

=== Wildlife refuges ===
- Amirkalayeh Wildlife Refuge
- Bakhtegan Wildlife Refuge
- Dar-e Anjir Wildlife Refuge
- Hamoon Wildlife Refuge
- Heydari Wildlife Refuge
- Miandasht Wildlife Refuge
- Miankaleh Wildlife Refuge
- Mouteh Wildlife Refuge
- Naybandan Wildlife Refuge
- Robat Shur Wildlife Refuge
- Selkeh Wildlife Refuge
- Shadegan Wildlife Refuge
- Shidvar Wildlife Refuge
- Sorkhankol Wildlife Refuge
- Touran Wildlife Refuge
- Shadegan Wildlife Area

=== National natural monuments ===
- Alam-Kuh
- Chenar-e Kamarbasteh
- Mount Damavand
- Sabalan
- Sarv-e Abarkuh
- Sarv-e Mehregan
- Taftan Volcano

=== Natural World Heritage Sites ===
- Caspian Hyrcanian mixed forests
- Lut Desert

=== Natural national heritage sites ===
- Ali-Sadr Cave
- Alvand
- Badab-e Surt
- Bil spring
- Bisheh Waterfall
- Chenar-e Kamarbasteh
- Chenar-e Khameneh
- Chenar-e Sukhteh Sarakhs
- Chenar-e Sukhteh Shahrud
- Deymeh Headwater
- Ghar Parau
- Gamasiyab Cave
- Gamasiyab Headwater
- Ganjnameh Waterfall
- Gerit Waterfall
- Giyan Headwater
- Golestan National Park
- Headwater of Bisotun
- Jashak salt dome
- Karun
- Mount Damavand
- Nojian Waterfall
- Ovan Lake
- Piran waterfall
- Quri Qala Cave
- Rahmat tree
- Sabalan
- Sarv-e Abarkuh
- Sarv-e Mehregan
- Shaho
- Valasht lake
- Zayanderud
- Zrebar Lake

== Other ==
- Cheshme Langan
- Golestan Kuh
- Poshtkue Forests
- Sataple Hunting Prohibited Area

== See also ==
- National Parks of Iran
- Protected areas of Iran
