= List of waterfalls in Iran =

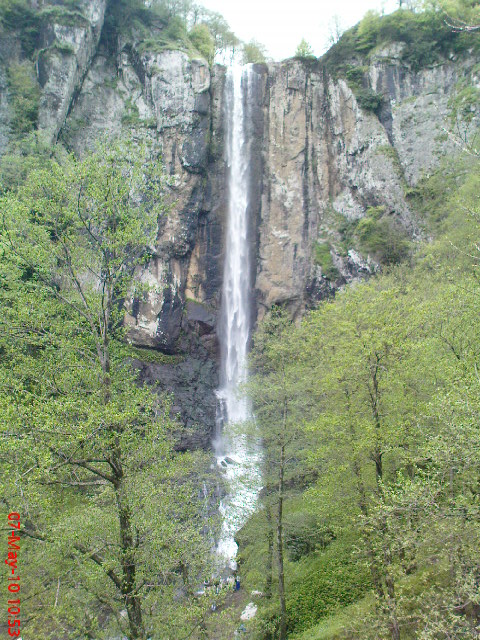
Lawton Waterfall (Gilan Province) The tallest waterfall in Iran

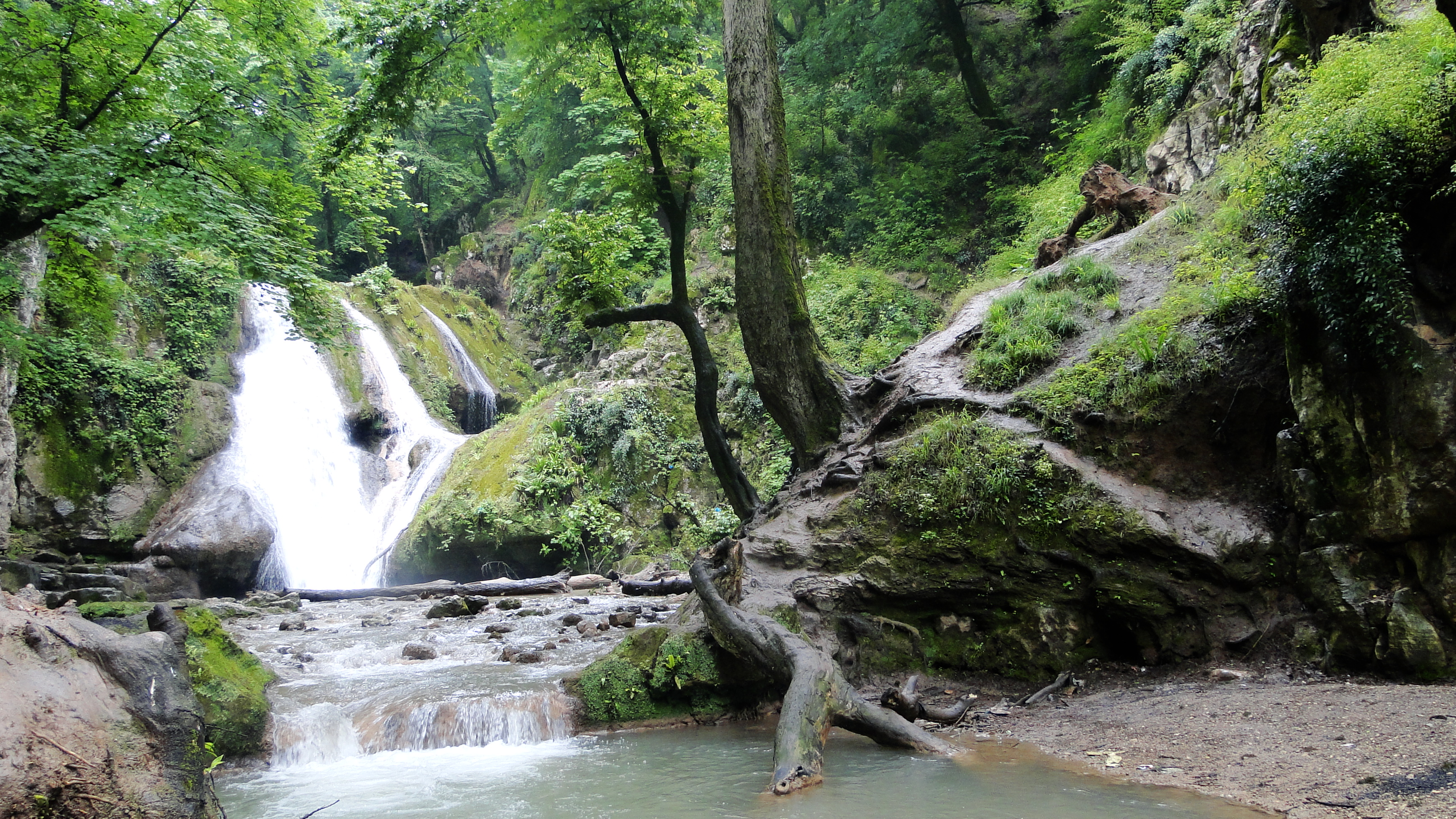
Lohe Waterfall - Golestan Province

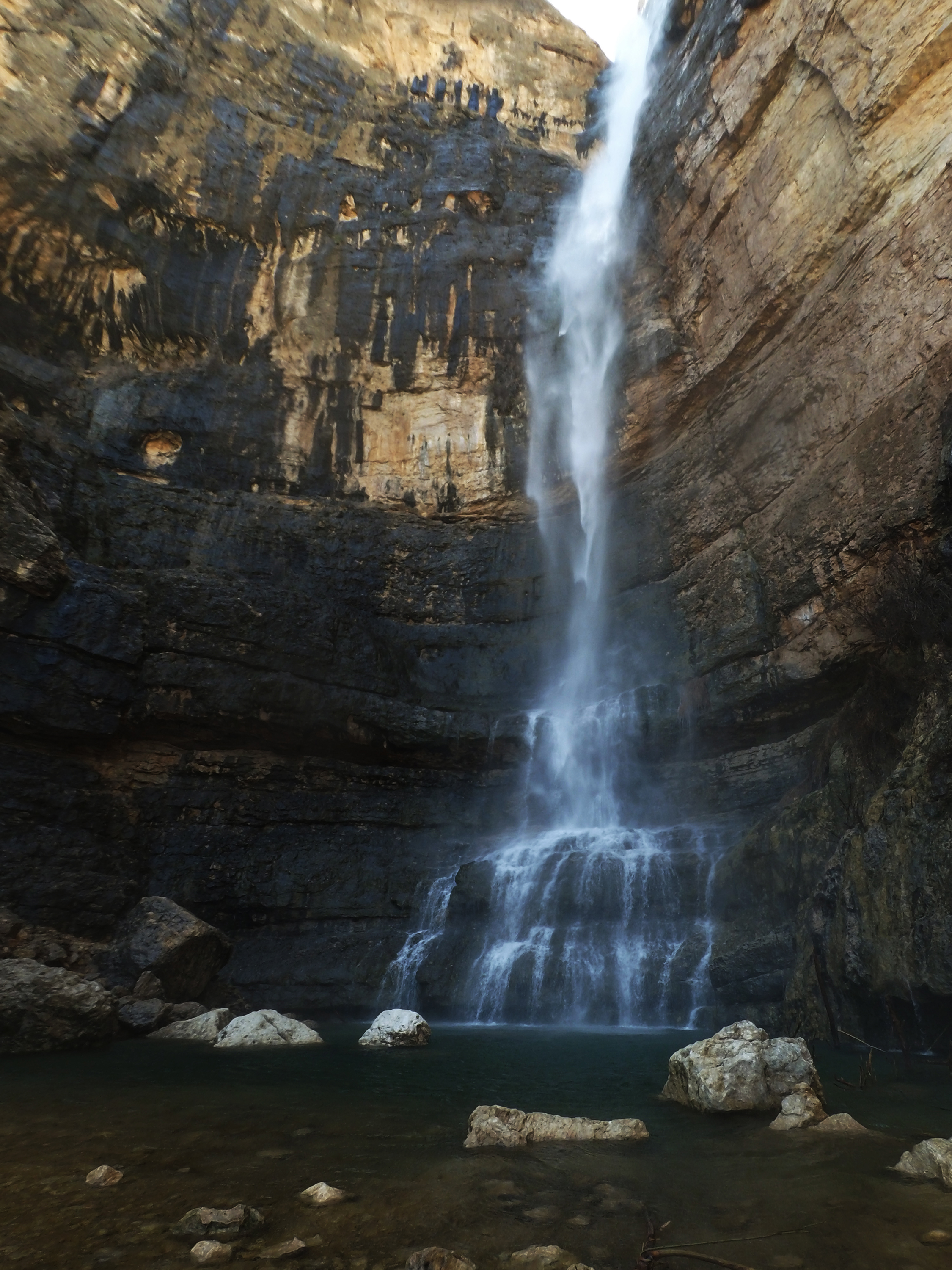
Taram Waterfall (Neyriz - Fars)

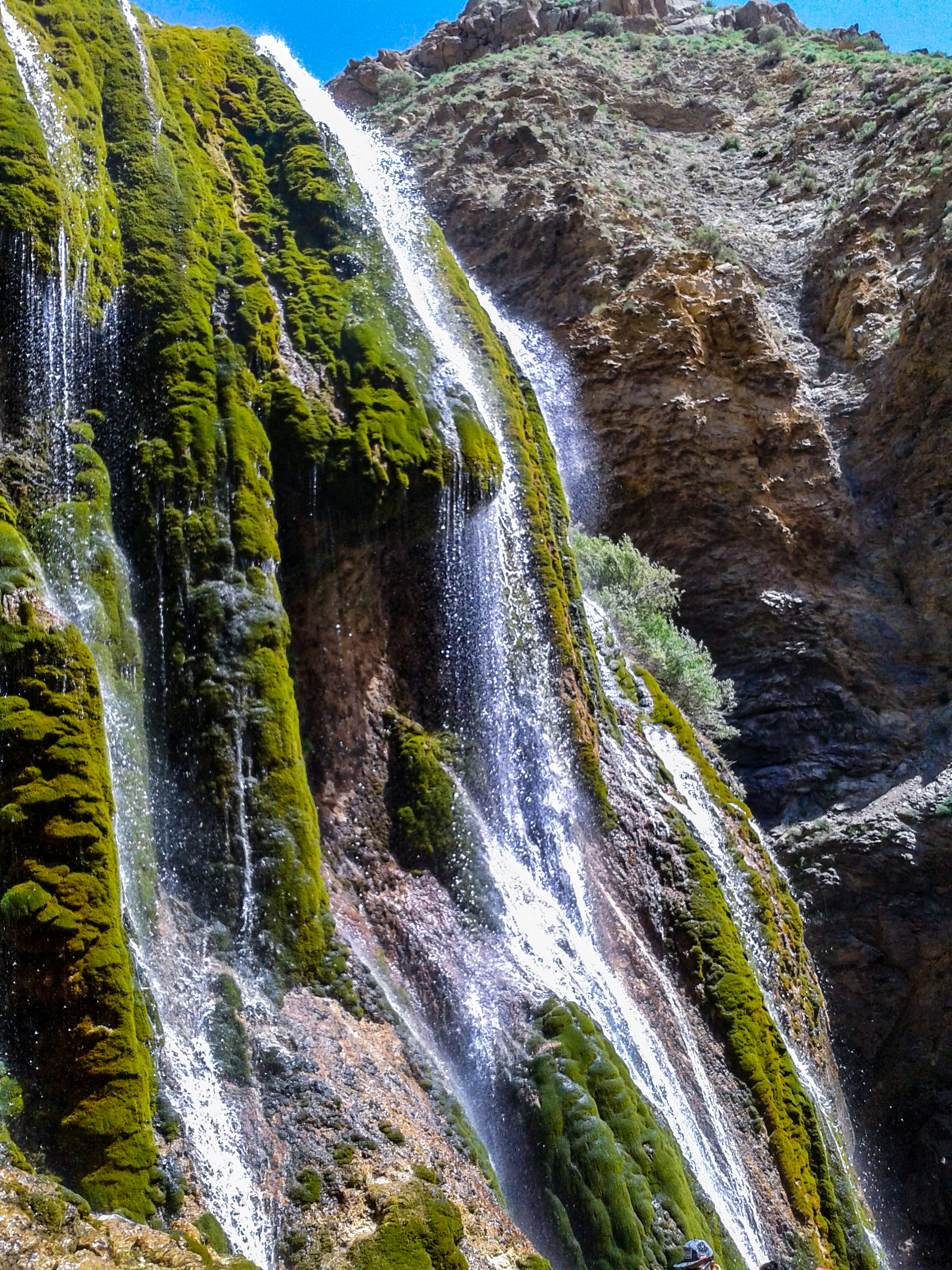
Poonehzar waterfall, Fereydunshahr, Isfahan

There are an estimated 392 waterfalls in Iran, 287 of which are substantial. Among them:

- Shahlolak Waterfall, is a permanent waterfall in Charmahin, Isfahan
- Atashgah Waterfall, the longest waterfall in Iran located in Chaharmahal and Bakhtiari
- Zarlimeh Waterfall, the widest waterfall in Iran located in Chaharmahal and Bakhtiar
- Ceredit Waterfall, the wildest waterfall in Iran located in Chaharmahal and Bakhtiari
- Asiab Kharabeh Waterfall, Eskander Waterfall (known as Malek Kian Waterfall), Maharan Waterfall all three are located in the East Azerbaijan Province
- Sibiye-Khani Waterfall is located in Lerd tourist village, Khalkhal county in Ardabil province.
- Shalmash Waterfall located in the West Azerbaijan Province
- Nashtrood Waterfall is located in Alborz, Karaj Province
- Goorgoor Waterfall, Sardabeh Waterfall located in Ardabil
- Khezr Waterfall, Kord Ali Waterfall, Takht-e Soleiman Waterfall, Bibi Seydan Waterfall, Poonehzar Waterfall of Fereydunshahr, Semirom Waterfall located in Isfahan
- Cham Av Waterfall is located in Ilam
- Sangan Waterfall, Imamzadeh Davood Waterfall, Osun Darband Waterfall, Dogholu Waterfall, Pich Adaran Seasonal Waterfall all located in Tehran
- Sheikh Alikhan Waterfall is located in Chaharmahal and Bakhtiari
- Tunele Koohrang Waterfall is located in Chaharmahal and Bakhtiari
- Darreh Eshgh Waterfall is located in Chaharmahal and Bakhtiari
- Karoudy Kan Waterfall is located in Chaharmahal and Bakhtiari
- Niakan Waterfall is located in Chaharmahal and Bakhtiari
- Shevi Waterfall located in Khuzestan Province (It is the largest natural waterfall in the Middle East and one of the most beautiful waterfalls in Iran)
- Ortokand Waterfall, Akhlamad Waterfall located in Khorasan Razavi
- Margoon Waterfall, Tarom Waterfall located in Fars
- Varvar Waterfall is located in Anbarabad in Kerman
- Sarand Kuh Waterfall (Darin) in Anbarabad in Kerman
- Raeen Waterfall in Kerman
- Ordikan Waterfall in Kerman
- Bal Waterfall in Kurdistan
- Bahram Bigi Boyerahmad Waterfall, Kanj Banar Gachsaran Waterfall, Sisakht Waterfall, Kamardoogh waterfall located in Kohgiluyeh and Boyerahmad
- Minoodasht Waterfall, Shirabad Waterfall, Kaboudwal Waterfall in Golestan
- Latoon Waterfall in Gilan
- Aznader Waterfall, Bishe Waterfall, Chakan Waterfall, Taf Waterfall, Nojian Waterfall, Varak Waterfall, Talai Waterfall in Lorestan
- Yakhi Waterfall, Shahandasht Waterfall, Amiri waterfall, Harijan Waterfall, Amol Waterfall, Ij or Dah Gholoo Waterfall in Mazandaran [3] [4] [5]

Many of Iran's waterfalls, such as Akhlamad, Afrineh, Ganjnameh, Niasar, Shushtar, Bishe, Gharah Su, Semirom, Vashi Strait, and Shahlolak Charmahin have historically had economic use. These waterfalls are great places for many tourist visits in Iran. Most of them are assisted by water grids.

During the rule of the Sassanids the Shushtar waterfalls were the first facilities for the water industry in the world. Shushtar waterfalls and Ganjnameh waterfall in Hamedan, along with historical inscriptions of Cyrus, have been historically registered in UNESCO, showing the glorious peak of ancient Iran.

== Tallest waterfalls ==
Permanent waterfalls above 80 meters in height

- Varvar Waterfall, with a height of 176 meters
- Nashtrood Waterfall, with a height of 110 meters
- Latoon Waterfall, 105 meters high
- Sarankuh Waterfall, with a height of over one hundred meters
- Darreh Eshgh Waterfall, with a height of about one hundred meters
- Piran Waterfall, with a height of about one hundred meters
- Shevi Waterfall, with a height of about one hundred meters
- Nojian Waterfall, with a height of about 90 meters
- Kordavi Kan Waterfall, with a height of more than 80 meters
- Margoon Waterfall, 80 meters high (more than ninety meters wide)
- Akhlamad Waterfall, with a height of about 80 meters
- Absefid Waterfall, with a height of about 70 meters
- Poonehzar Waterfall, with a height of more than 70 meters
- Shahlolak Waterfall, with a height of about 70 meters
- Berenjeh Waterfall, with a height of 750 meters is a seasonal waterfall
