= Margun, Iran =

Margun or Margoon (Persian: مارگون) in Iran may refer to:

- Margun, Fars
- Margun, Sistan and Baluchestan
- Margun, Zanjan
- Margoon Waterfall, in Fars Province
