= Pirouz (cheetah) =

Individual cheetah cub in Iran

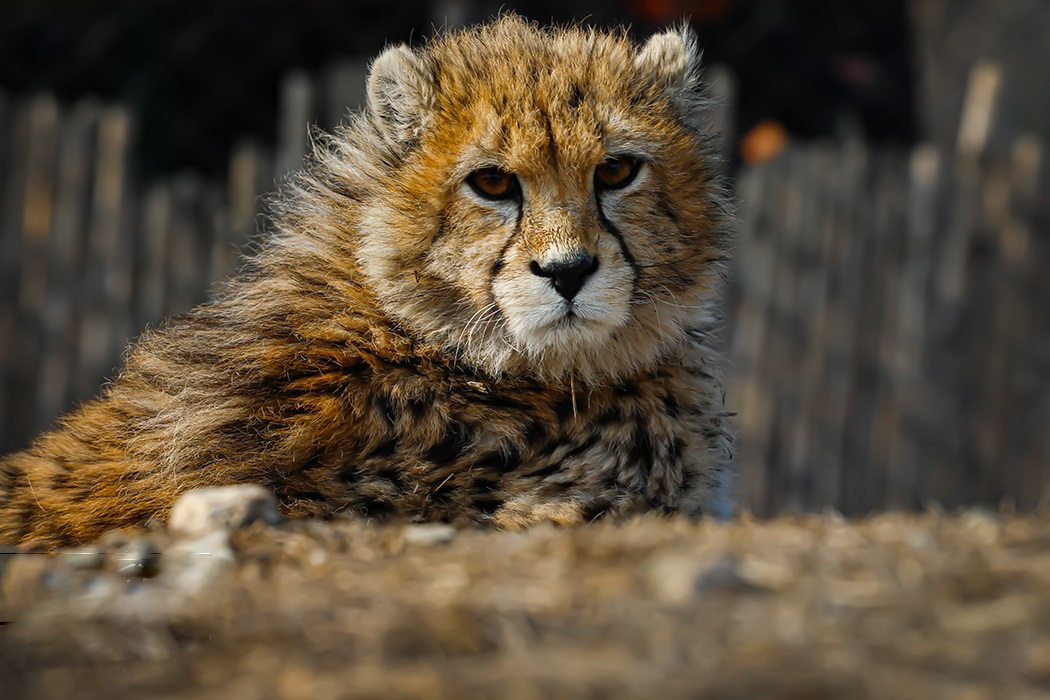
- Species: Acinonyx jubatus venaticus
- Sex: Male
- Born: May 1, 2022; Asian Cheetah Breeding Center, Khar Turan National Park
- Died: February 28, 2023 (aged 10 months); Central Veterinary Hospital, Tehran
- Cause of death: Kidney failure
- Parents: Firouz and Iran

Pirouz (Persian: پیروز, meaning "victorious"; 1 May 2022 – 28 February 2023) was an Asiatic cheetah born in Iran. The child of two Asiatic cheetahs named "Iran" and "Firouz", Pirouz was the only surviving cub of the three that were born. The birth of the cubs notably marked the first time the subspecies had reproduced in captivity. As one of the last remaining Asiatic cheetahs in the world, Pirouz reached great popularity during his lifetime.

== Life ==
Born on 1 May 2022, Pirouz was the only surviving cub of three live births of the female cheetah "Iran". The three male cubs were born in captivity via a C section operation; this resulted in the mother not recognizing the cubs, thus forcing the cubs to live separately and without maternal care. The birth of the cubs marked the first time the subspecies had reproduced in captivity. Two of the cubs died shortly after birth, making Pirouz the only surviving cub. One of the cubs reportedly died on 4 May due to malformations in the left lung and lung adhesion, while the second died two weeks after the death of the first cub due to "poor quality milk".

Pirouz was projected to remain in Tehran until he was six months old, after which he might have been transferred to the Khar Turan National Park if his health problems were resolved. He reportedly suffered from digestive and kidney problems since birth. In February 2023, Pirouz was reportedly transferred to a veterinary hospital due to health complications. On 28 February 2023, Pirouz reportedly died in the veterinary hospital in Iran at the age of ten months due to kidney failure. At the time of his death, only a dozen Asiatic cheetahs remained in Iran, nine of which were male and three of which were female.

== Reactions ==
Since the birth of Pirouz and the deaths of the other two cubs, animal rights activists strongly criticized their conditions in Iran. According to the US-based news channel Iran International, the death of Pirouz "infuriated many Iranians who blamed government incompetence in raising him". According to the Saudi-based news channel Al Arabiya, "Iran's government faced backlash and criticism on social media following the death of Pirouz, while Iranians opposed to the Islamic Republic saw Pirouz's death as yet another show of incompetence by the authorities."

Previously in January 2018, eight environmental researchers studying the Asiatic cheetah in Iran were jailed and accused of spying for using camera traps, while a special committee appointed by President Rouhani concluded in May 2018 that there was no evidence supporting the charges. Human rights organizations, conservation groups, and European politicians urged Iranian authorities to give the jailed researchers a fair trial. As a result of the crackdown on researchers, many conservation researchers feared working in Iran. In 2021, the standards for keeping animals in Iranian zoos and the treatment of the animals was reported as a cause for concern.

Pirouz and the danger of the subspecies' extinction have been mentioned in the Grammy Award-winning song "Baraye" by Shervin Hajipour, causing widespread public attention.
