= Gerit Waterfall =

Coordinates: 33.289017°N 48.7216310°E

- آبشار گریت
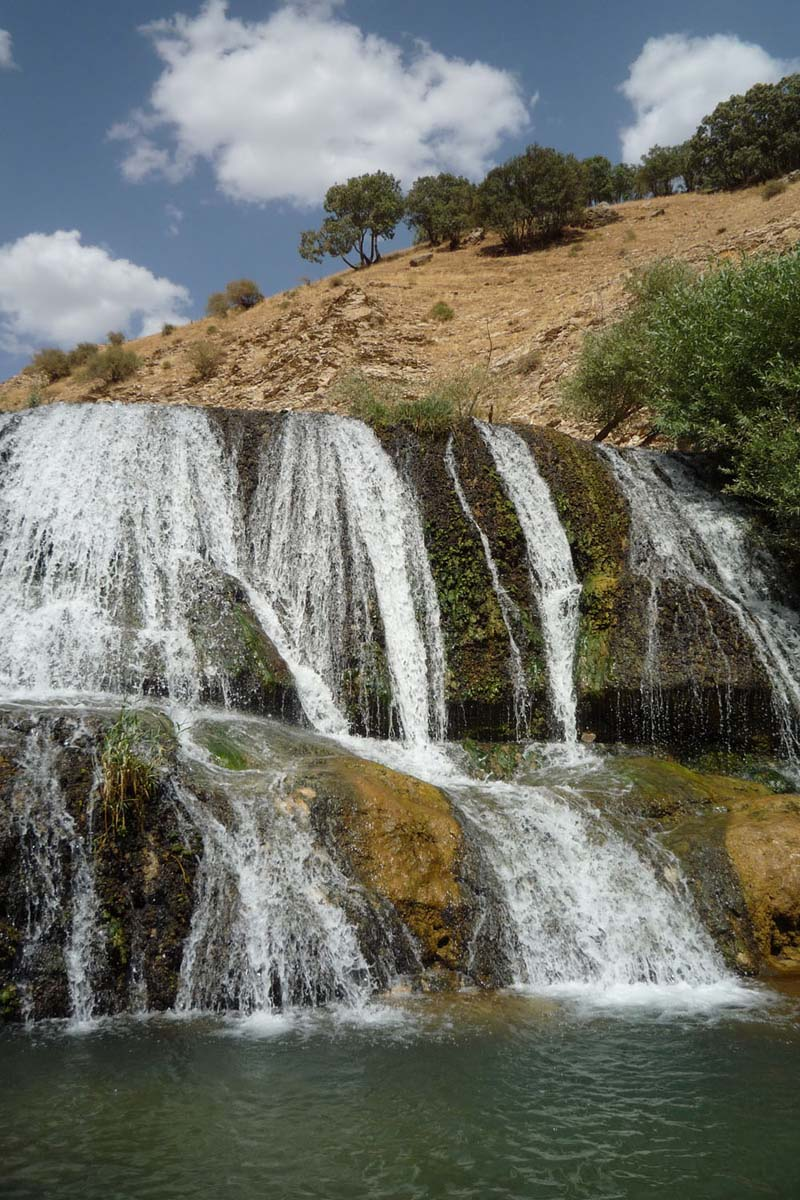
- Gerit Waterfall
- Interactive map of Gerit Waterfall
- Location: Sarkaneh Abbasabad, Papi District, Khorramabad County, lorestan Province, Iran
- Longest drop: 15 metres (49 ft)
- Total width: 17

The Gerit Waterfall (Persian: آبشار گریت) also known as Sarkaneh or Haft Cheshmeh (meaning seven springs), (in Luri: آوشار تاف هفت چشمه) is a waterfall in the Khorramabad County, at the Village of Sarkaneh Abbasabad in the Papi District of lorestan Province located in west of Iran.

Gerit waterfall is located 50 km from Khorramabad and close by Tehran-south railway, Sepiddasht station.

== Description ==
Gerit waterfall's height is about 15 meters with the wideness of about 17 meters and it joins the Sezar river. Around the Gerit waterfall there are several locations covered with oak, vine, and hawthorn trees.

Gerit waterfall is the 75th national natural waterfall effect that was located on the list of natural heritage in October 2009 by the Cultural Heritage Organization of Iran.

== See also ==
- List of waterfalls
- Nojian waterfall
