= Ali Yachkaschi =

Iranian environmental scientist (1939–2025)

- Born: 30 April 1939; Behshahr, Iran
- Died: 1 May 2025 (aged 86); Germany
- Education: University of Göttingen
- Known for: Father of Environmental Science in Iran
- Scientific career
- Fields: Environmental science, Forestry education

Ali Yachkaschi (Persian: علی یخکشی; alternative spellings: Ali Yakhkeshi; 30 April 1939 – 1 May 2025) was an Iranian professor of Environmental science, environmental activist and author. Following his high school diploma, he left Iran to continue his higher education at the University of Göttingen in Germany. He achieved a B.Sc, M.Sc as well as a PhD degree in management and policy of natural resources from the University of Göttingen. He is known as the “Father of Environmental Sciences in Iran”, due to his outstanding efforts and achievements to publicize the awareness to environmental protection in the country, including the foundation of environmental sciences as an independent field of study in 1974 at the University of Tehran, Iran. During his career at universities of Tehran and Mazandaran, he initiated numerous exchange programs for students and academic staff of Iranian and German faculties of forest and environmental sciences, thereby contributing to strengthening the mutual cultural and scientific understanding between scientific centers of both countries.

== Biography ==
Ali Yachkaschi was born on 30 April 1939, in Yachkasch village, a mountainous village located within the forested areas in south of Behshahr, Mazandaran province in northern Iran. He accomplished his primary, secondary as well as high school in Behshahr, before he left to Germany to carry on his higher education at the Georg-August University of Göttingen. Upon his return to Iran in 1967, he contributed to found the environmental sciences as an independent field of study within the faculty of natural resources of the University of Tehran. He was awarded numerous prizes and was acknowledged several times for his efforts in terms of education and research in environmental sciences. Examples can be referred such as being appreciated as the outstanding university professor in Iran (2000), the veteran professor of the University of Mazandaran (2001), National Environmental Prize (2002), and the golden statue of the Iranian association of environmentalists (2004). He also initiated one of the earliest attempts towards the idea of Dialogue Among Civilizations within the German academic landscape. Yachkaschi died on 1 May 2025, at the age of 86.

== Experiences and honors ==
- Habilitation in policy and management of natural resources at the Georg-August-University of Göttingen, Germany (1974)
- Academic member at the University of Tehran, Iran (1968-1980)
- Academic member at the Georg-August-University of Göttingen, Germany (1980-2000)
- Research spokesman of the Georg-August-University of Göttingen, Germany (...)
- Representative of Asian-African countries and member of the directory board of the International Union of Forest Research Organizations (IUFRO)
- Member of the directory board of the global society of Asian-African researchers
- Foundation of the cultural German-Iranian Cultural Foundation
- Academic member at the University of Mazandaran, Iran (2000-2010)
- Consultant of the research and education deputy of the National Department of Environment, Iran (2003 so far)
- Winner of the National Environmental Prize of Iran 2003
- Winner of the golden statue of environmental research of Iran 2005
- Selected outstanding professor of Iran 2001
- Awarded as being amongst the 30 greatest Iranian environmentalists 2009
- Management and coordination of over 10 national and international research projects
- Authorship of 26 text books in environmental policy and management in Persian & German
- More than 90 peer reviewed research papers in German, English, French, Turkish and Persian
- Initiative for the plantation of over 60 ha of forests in Iran
- Contribution to the FAO global forest tenure reform
- Contribution in mapping the Urmia Lake National Park 1977
- Supervision of more than 100 Students on their Master- and PhD- thesis at the University of Goettingen (Germany), University of Mazandaran, University of Tehran, Tarbiat Modares University, Gorgan University in Iran and some universities in Armenia.
