= Mianjangal Protected Area =

Protected area in Iran

- Interactive map of Mianjangal Protected Area
- Nearest city: Sarvestan, Fasa
- Area: 565.28 square kilometres (218.3 sq mi)
- Established: 1988
- Governing body: Department of Environment (Iran)

The Mianjangal protected area is a protected area located near the town of Sarvestan in the south of Iran.

== See also ==
- List of national parks and protected areas of Iran
