= Dena National Park and Protected Area =

National park & protected area in Iran

- IUCN category II (national park)
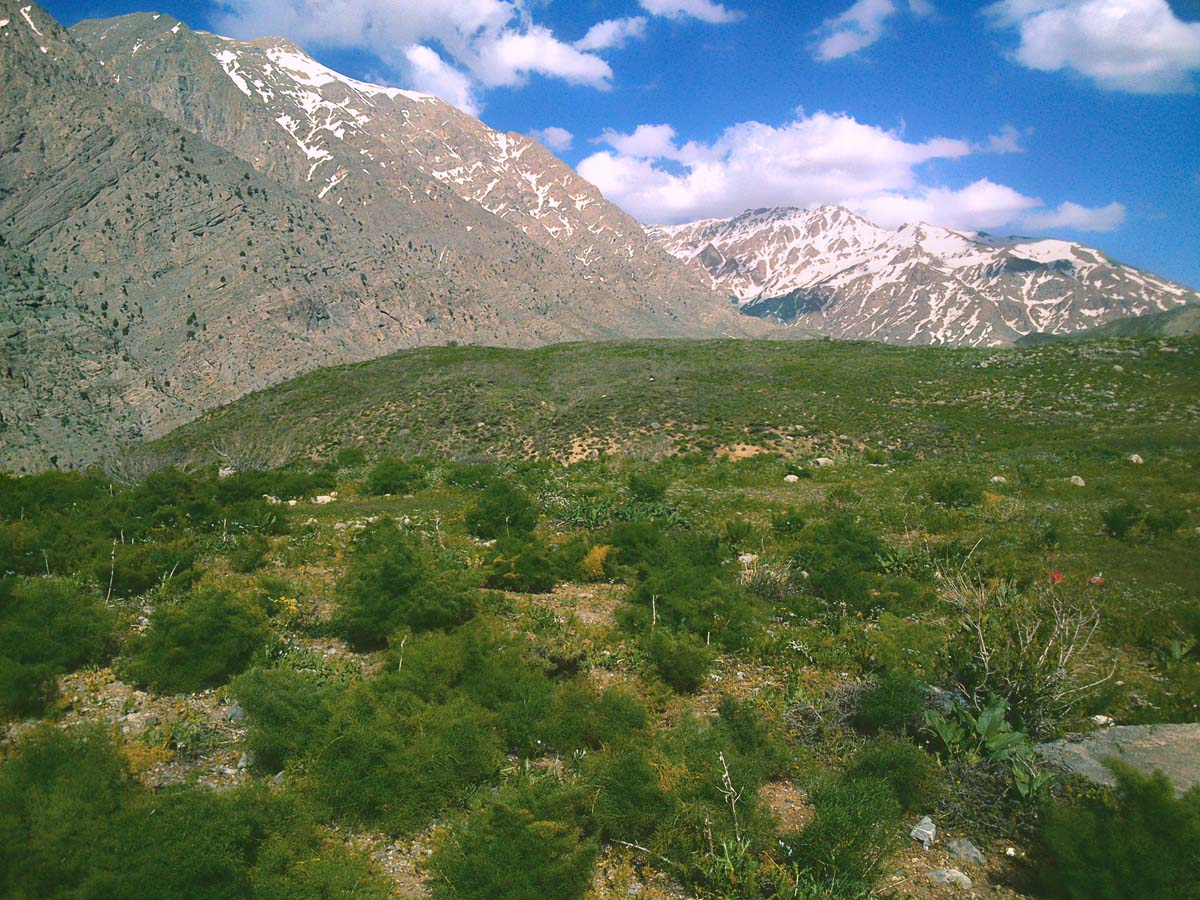
- Dena Protected Area, Kuh-e Gol

- Location within Iran
- Location: Dana County and Semirom County, Iran
- Coordinates: 30.57°N 51.26°E
- Area: 93,660 ha (361.6 sq mi)
- Established: 1990
- Governing body: Department of Environment (Iran)

Dena Biosphere Reserve, National Park, and Protected Area is one of the areas protected by the Department of Environment of Iran. It is located in the Dena mountain range in the provinces of Isfahan and Kohgiluyeh and Boyer-Ahmad. The Dena mountain range, which is 80 kilometers long, is the longest range in the Zagros Mountains and contains 49 peaks with heights over 4,000 meters.

Important wildlife habitats in Dena include Tang-e Shah Qasem, Chahar Tang-e Kel Noghre'i, Tang-e Potak, Tang-e Qodvis, Shanbliyeh Dun, Tang-e Shahsvaar, Tang-e Heydari, Kharedun, Tel Siah, Alij, Gorvil, Ab Makh, Tang-e Poun-ei, Gardaneh Bijan, Tang-e Hara, Tang-e Tufal, Darreh Nari Waterfall, Ben Shahi, Gardaneh Atabaki, Tel Sabz, Gardaneh Morak, the oak forests on the edges of Dena, Tang-e Ban Rud, Tang-e Koreh, Nahmun, Mortovileh, Khaki, Qibla, and Asemuni. In these habitats, tourists, researchers, and nature enthusiasts can easily observe the wildlife of the Zagros with the naked eye or with binoculars. The comprehensive ecology of the wildlife can be studied and examined in this region.

The most important population centers located on the edge of the Dena Protected Area include the city of Sisakht, the city of Pataveh, the village complex of Koreh, the village of Meymand, the village of Sivar, and the village complex of Padena.

The eastern border of the Dena Protected Area starts from the north of the city of Sisakht, the center of Dana County. Some of the most important environmental protection stations include Kharedun, the Koreh village environmental station, Ab Sepah, and Meymand. The Dena Protected Area, with an area of 93,821 hectares, is recognized as a biosphere reserve and is located in the southwestern part of the country, in Kohgiluyeh and Boyer-Ahmad Province. The geographical coordinates are E51.21 and N30.57. On the other hand, there are numerous valleys on the slopes of Dena that are full of small and large springs. Many of these springs emerge from under the snow and flow down the steep slopes of Dena, joining together to form the cold, sweet, and clear rivers Bashar and Khersan.

== History of Conservation ==
According to Resolution No. 126 dated January 26, 1991, of the High Council for Environmental Protection, the Dena region, with an area of 93,660 hectares, was declared a protected area. According to Resolution No. 360 of the High Council for Environmental Protection (Infrastructure Commission of the Government) dated April 19, 2012, the protective level of part of this area, with an area of 25,822 hectares, was upgraded to a national park.

In 2010, the Dena Protected Area was recognized as an Iranian biosphere reserve by UNESCO. Dena is the tenth biosphere reserve in Iran and the first reserve registered after the revolution. The Department of Environment is required to document and explain its actions in the management and protection of the area every 10 years in the presence of UNESCO representatives in order to obtain international support for another 10-year period. In early June 2023, Dena National Park and Protected Area was renewed for another 10-year period in the list of UNESCO biosphere reserves.

On May 2, 2024, in the thirty-eighth meeting of the High Council for Environmental Protection, it was approved to upgrade the protection level of the hunting prohibited area of Padena in Isfahan Province, covering an area of 30,132 hectares, to the level of a protected area. Additionally, the management of part of the Dena Protected Area, located in Isfahan Province and covering less than 30,000 hectares, was transferred. Consequently, a total area of 61,500 hectares is now under the protection of the Isfahan Department of Environment, named the Padena Protected Area. According to the Deputy of Natural Environment and Biodiversity of the Department of Environment, Dena National Park was not subject to this resolution. Even part of the Dena National Park located in Isfahan Province is currently managed entirely by Kohgiluyeh and Boyer-Ahmad Province, and this resolution has no connection to Dena National Park.

== Ecological Features ==
The Dena Protected Area, located north of the cities of Yasuj and Sisakht in Kohgiluyeh and Boyer-Ahmad Province, the south of Isfahan Province, and a small part of Chaharmahal and Bakhtiari Province in the Karun watershed, is a completely mountainous region with an elevation difference of about three thousand meters between its lowest and highest points. The region is divided into three distinct climatic sections: high altitudes, dry and semi-dry forests, and cold semi-steppe. Currently, the diversity of plant species across the central Zagros totals over two thousand species, of which approximately 1,250 species have been identified in the Dena Protected Area. This number represents 15.6% of the country's species.
