= Heydari Wildlife Refuge =

Wildlife refuge in Iran

- IUCN category Ib (wilderness area)
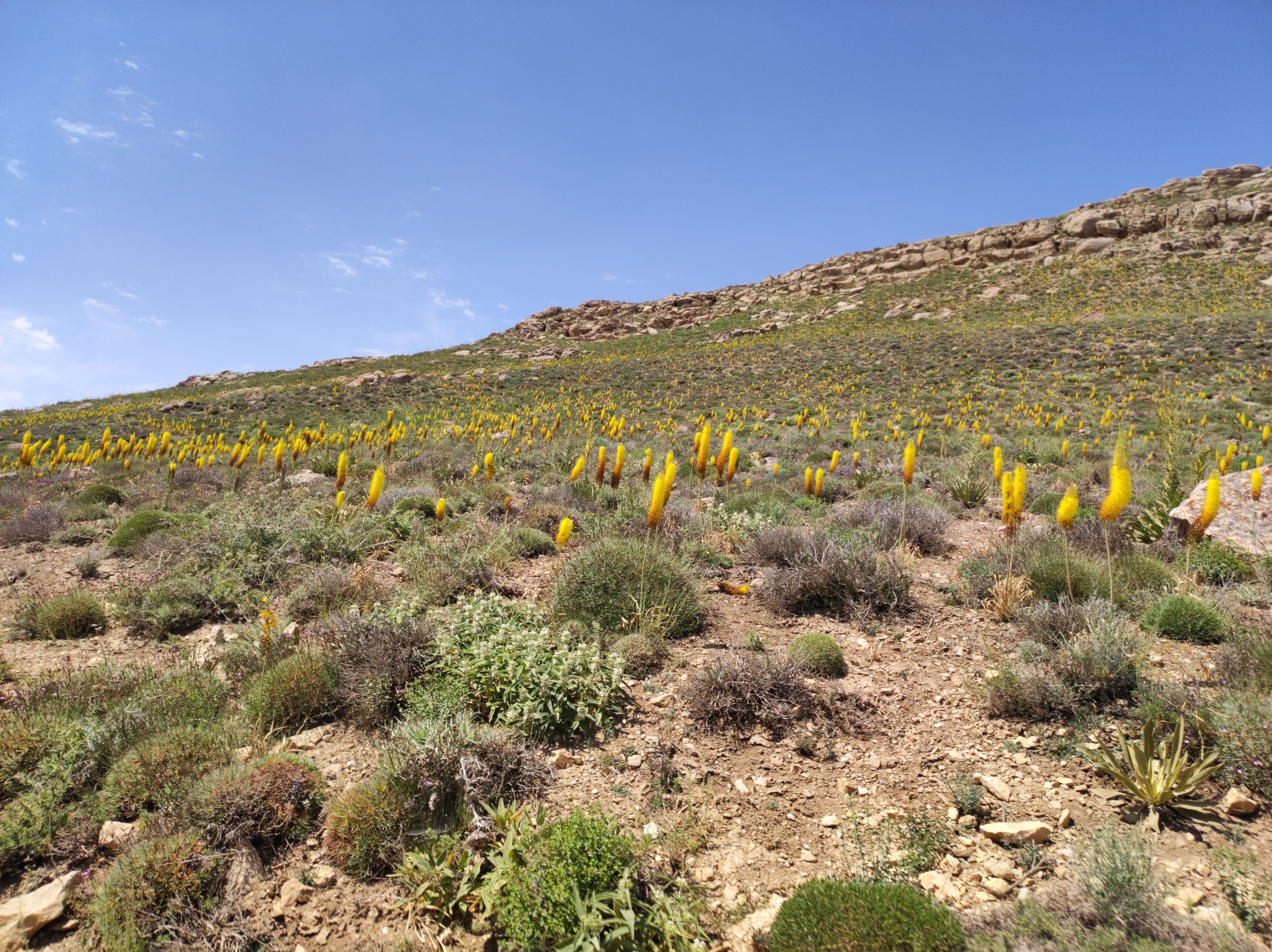
- Flora in Heydari Wildlife Refuge
- Interactive map of Heydari Wildlife Refuge
- Location: Razavi Khorasan Province, Iran
- Nearest city: Nishapur
- Coordinates: 36.6693765°N 58.6532253°E
- Area: 46,932 ha (181.21 sq mi)
- Established: June 11, 2002
- Governing body: Department of Environment of Iran

Heydari Wildlife Refuge is a wildlife refuge with an area of 46,932 hectares located in Nishapur County, Razavi Khorasan Province, Iran. This wildlife refuge was added to the list of protected areas of the Department of Environment of Iran according to resolution No. 591 on June 11, 2002 (21 Khordad 1381).

== See also ==
- List of national parks and protected areas of Iran
