= Miandasht Wildlife Refuge =

Reserve in northeastern Iran

Coordinates: 36.9000°N 56.8000°E

Miandasht Wildlife Refuge (Persian: پناهگاه حیات وحش میاندشت) is a reserve in northeastern Iran. It comprises 844 square kilometres of semi desert and shrub land and is home to the endangered Asiatic cheetah.

== History and location ==
Miandasht Wildlife Refuge is situated in North Khorasan Province in northeastern Iran. It has been designated as a Wildlife Reserve by the Iranian Department of the Environment since 1973. The reserve is located to the south of Golestan National Park, and to the east of Khar Turan National Park.

== Landscape and vegetation ==
The reserve comprises 84.435 hectares of dry flat plains interrupted by rolling hills. Most of the reserve lies slightly below 1000 m, the highest point is reached at 1340 m above sea level. The mean annual precipitation is 150 mm. The Jajarm Kalshour River flows in the area. Around the reserve are some human settlements and during winter about 15.000 heads of livestock graze in the reserve. The desert-like landscape is covered with wormwood (Artemisia sieberi), feather grass (Stipa), saltwort (Salsola), saxaul trees (Haloxylon) and tamarisk (Tamarix).

== Fauna ==
Miandasht Wildlife Refuge is home to the rare Asiatic cheetah. Other confirmed carnivore species include striped hyena (Hyaena hyaena), grey wolf (Canis lupus), Asiatic caracal (Caracal caracal schmitzi), Turkestan wildcat (Felis silvestris caudata), red fox (Vulpes vulpes) and common jackal (Canis aureus aureus).

Larger herbivores are represented by goitered gazelles, low numbers of wild sheep (Ovis), and Carpathian boars (Sus scrofa attila). Rodents and hares are abundant. The main raptors are the long-legged buzzard (Buteo ruffinus) and the golden eagle (Aquila heliaca).

== Sightings ==
On 7 January 2015, the Director General of Environmental Protection Department in North Khorasan announced a sighting of a female Asiatic cheetah and her cub at Miandasht Wildlife Refuge. Motahari also maintained that two days prior to this sighting, three other adult cheetahs were sighted by the locals some kilometers to the eastern border of Miandasht, and immediately reported to Jajrom Department of Environment. It is estimated that 8 to 10 cheetahs are living at the wildlife refuge.
