= Niasar Waterfall =

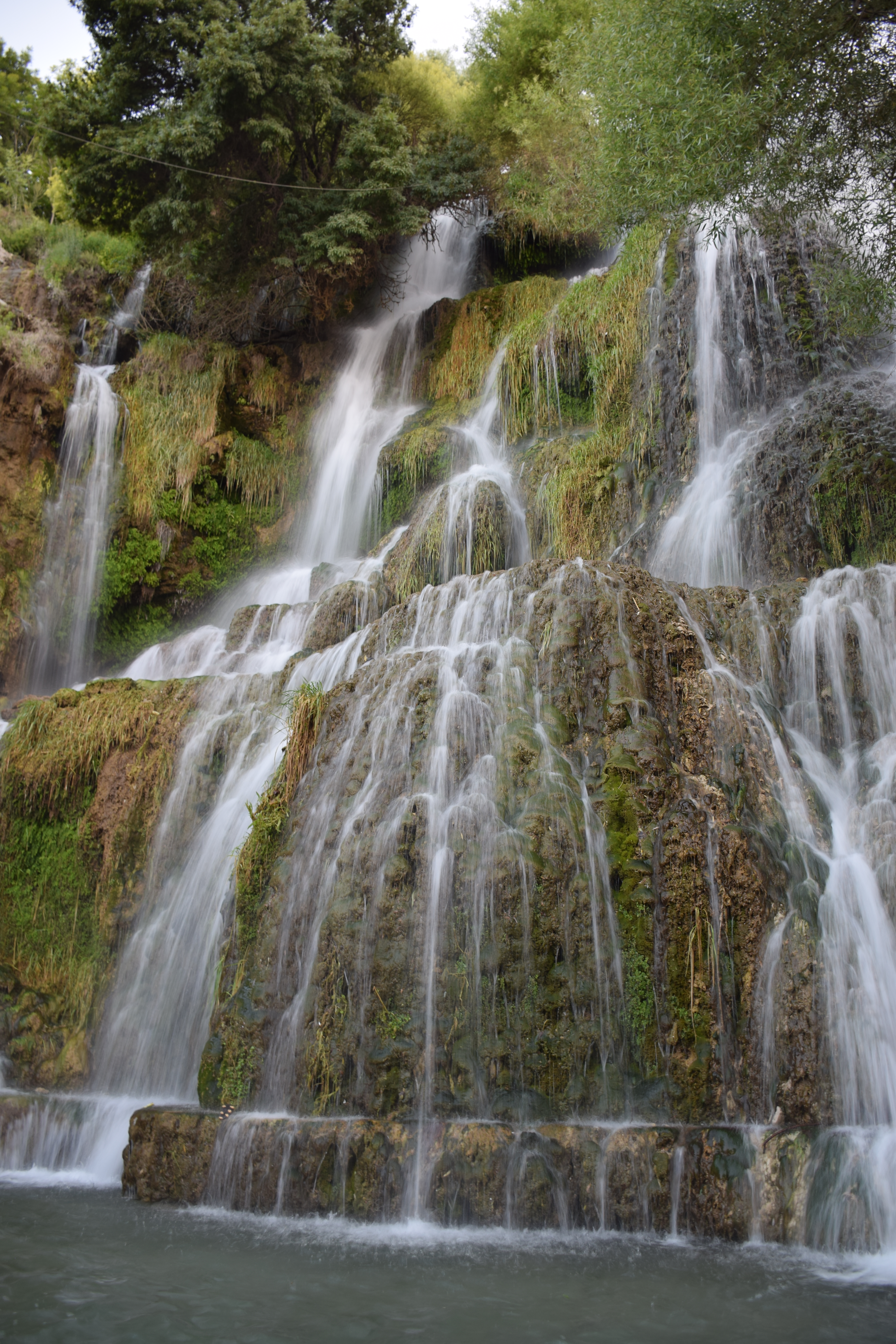
Niasar Waterfall

Niasar Waterfall is a 25- to 53-meter-high spring-fed waterfall in Neyasar, Iran, near Kashar. The source of the waterfall is Talar spring, also known as Iskandarieh spring. The watercourse once hosted as many as 13 mills, of which only two survive today.

== See also ==
- List of waterfalls in Iran
