= Naybandan Wildlife Sanctuary =

Wildlife sanctuary in South Khorasan province, Iran

Coordinates: 32.5000°N 57.50000°E

Nayband Wildlife Sanctuary, Naybandan Wildlife Refuge or Nayband National Park is a National Park in Iran. It is situated in South Khorasan Province at 180.0 km (111.8 miles) south of Tabas. It has recently been given legal protection.

== Topography ==
The sanctuary has various topographic areas like mountains, plains, sand plains, hilly desert plains, and water with different taste from the most salty water to the freshest water.

== Fauna ==
Mammals like Asiatic cheetahs, Persian leopard, caracal, wild goat, jebeer gazelle, wild sheep, mouflon, ibex, Blanford's fox, Rüppell's fox, and exotic and valuable birds like bustard, cuckoo, Pleske's ground jay, and other birds such as partridge, crao, hoopoe, lark, horned lark, different types of owls, eagles, vultures. Reptilians include the Jafari snake, viper, camel snake, asp, horned asp, gecko and lizard. Rodents include rats and porcupines. Insect-eaters include the hedgehog and bat.

== See also ==
- Khar Turan National Park
- Wildlife of Iran
