= Margoon Waterfall =

Waterfall in Iran

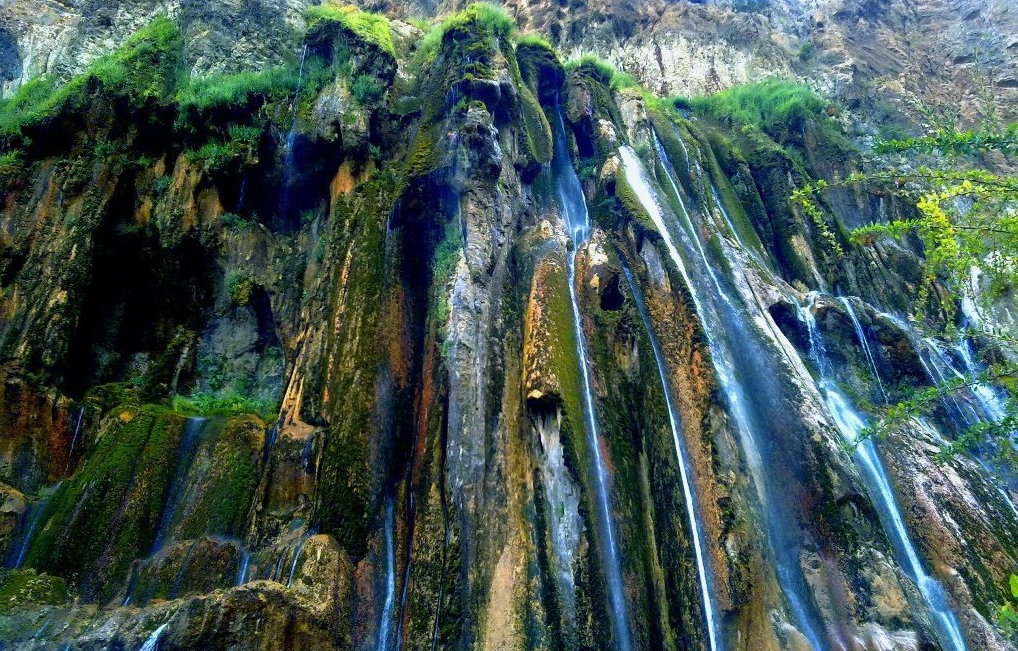
- Interactive map of Margoon Waterfall
- Location: Margan, Sepidan County, Fars province, Iran
- Total height: 70 m (230 ft)

Margoon Waterfall (Persian: آبشار مارگون, lit. 'Snake-like Waterfall'), also spelled Margun Waterfall, is located near Margan village in the Fars province of Iran. It has a height of 70 meters.

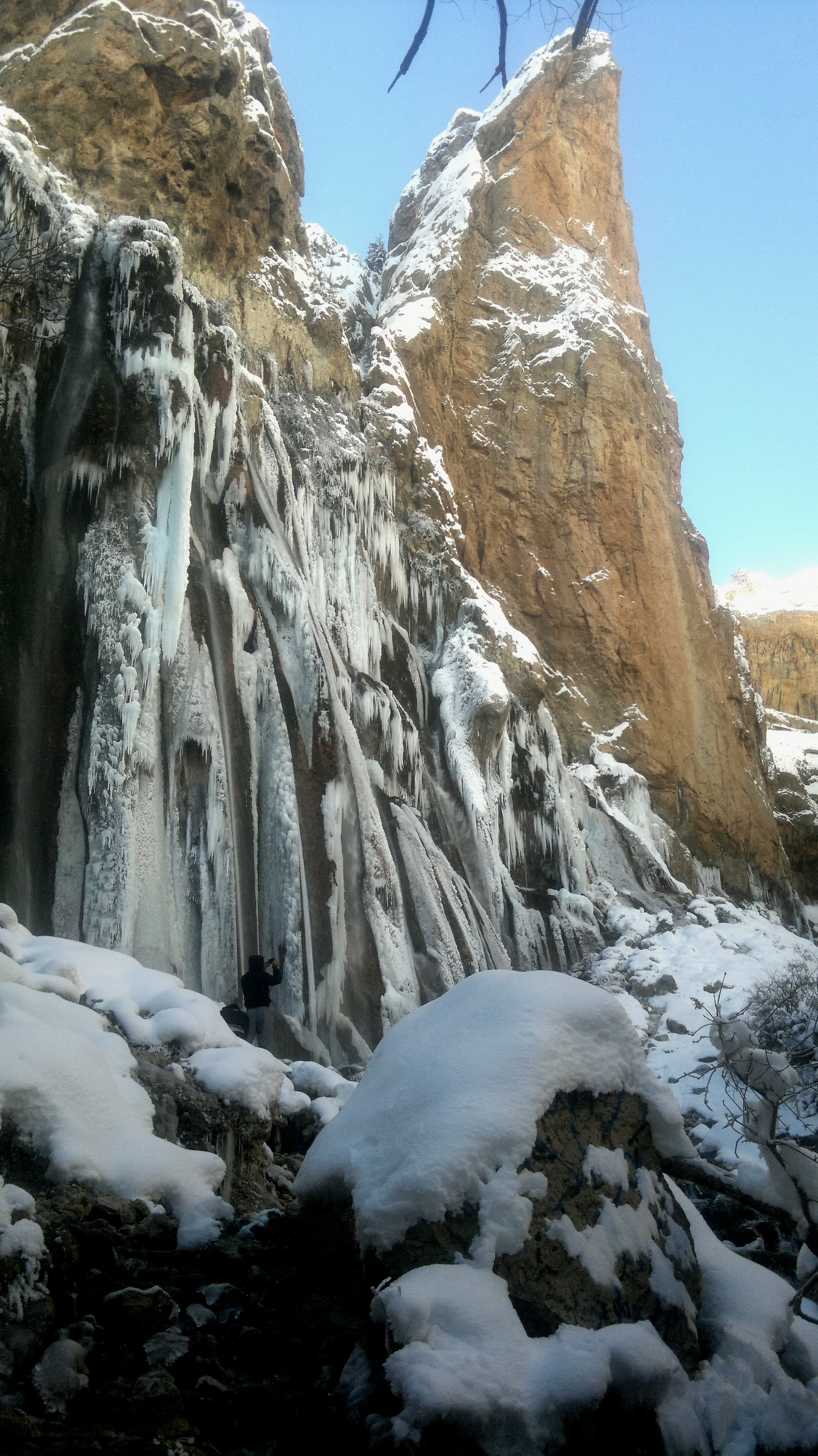
Margoon waterfall in winter

== See also ==
- List of waterfalls
