= Sarkaneh Abbasabad =

Sarkaneh Abbasabad سركانه عباس اباد
- Village
- Location within Iran
- Coordinates: 33°28′00″N 48°44′00″E
- Country: Iran
- Province: Lorestan
- County: Khorramabad
- Bakhsh: Papi
- Rural District: Gerit

Population (2006)
  - Total: 50
- Time zone: UTC+3:30 (IRST)
  - Summer (DST): UTC+4:30 (IRDT)

Sarkaneh Abbasabad (Persian: سركانه عباس اباد, also Romanized as Sarkāneh ‘Abbāsābād; also known as Sarkāneh) is a village in Gerit Rural District, Papi District, Khorramabad County, Lorestan Province, Iran. At the 2006 census, its population was 50, in 10 families.
