= Urmia Lake National Park =

Protected area in Iran

- IUCN category II (national park)
- Interactive map of Urmia Lake National Park
- Location: East Azerbaijan and West Azerbaijan, Iran
- Coordinates: 37°40′N 45°25′E
- Area: 464,056 ha (1,791.73 sq mi)
- Established: 1973
- Governing body: Iran Department of Environment

Urmia Lake National Park is a national park in Iran, located between the provinces of East Azerbaijan and West Azerbaijan at geographical coordinates 37 to 38.5 degrees north latitude and 45 to 46 degrees east longitude. The park covers an area of 464,056 hectares (1,792 sq mi). The lake includes a total of 102 large and small islands with an area of 33,486 hectares (129 sq mi). Urmia Lake was registered in the list of national parks of Iran in 1973.

Urmia Lake National Park is one of the nine biosphere reserves in Iran. There are a total of 10 water reservoirs in Urmia Lake National Park, with a capacity of 180,000 litres (6,357 cu ft).

UNESCO Biosphere Reserves in Iran
