= Lake of Ghosts =

Lake in Iran

Mamraz Koti: Hornbeam Lake or Lake of Ghosts
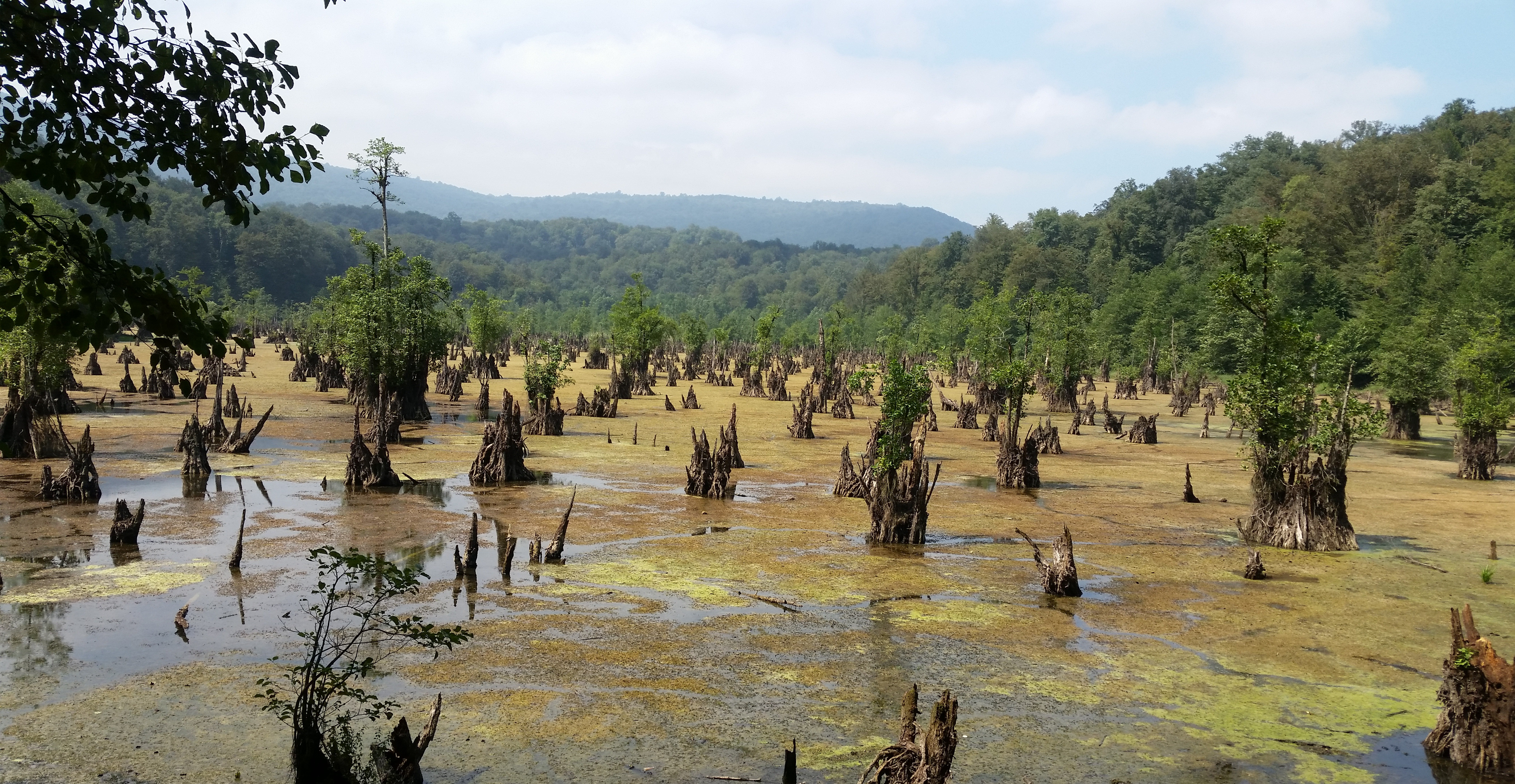
- The Ghost lake in Vanush

- Location within Iran
- Interactive map of Mamraz Koti: Hornbeam Lake or Lake of Ghosts
- Location: Mazandaran, Vanush
- Coordinates: 36°30′18.7″N 51°50′12.4″E
- Basin countries: Iran
- Max. length: 700 m (2,300 ft)
- Max. width: 300 m (980 ft)
- Surface area: 40 acres (16 ha)
- Average depth: 10 m (33 ft)
- Max. depth: 10 m (33 ft)

Ramsar Wetland
- Official name: Lake Urmia [or Orumiyeh]
- Designated: 23 June 1975
- Reference no.: 38

The Lake of Ghosts (Mamraz Lake) is a small lake situated in the richly-forested Iranian province of Mazandaran, and located 48 kilometres (30 mi) from the city of Nowshahr. The settlement nearest the lake is the village of Vanush. The local name for this lake is Mamraz (meaning hornbeam in Persian), but it is better known by the names "Ghost Lake" or "Lake of Ghosts" - given it in reference to its eerie swampland landscape featuring countless half-drowned trees, often shrouded in mist, giving them the appearance of phantoms.

== Natural history ==
'The Lake of Ghosts' or 'Hornbeam Lake' has long been regarded as a site of natural beauty by virtue not only of its geographical location, but also of a flora rich in plant species, both woody and herbaceous. This lake has been registered in the Cultural Heritage, Handicrafts and Tourism Organization of Iran by the registered number of 402 in order to preserve its animal and plant species. The formation of the lake took place over a geological timespan extending from the middle Cretaceous to the Quaternary period.

The length of the lake is 300 m (980 ft) and its width is 70 m (230 ft) and in total it covers an area of 40 hectares (99 acres) with the surface and its surroundings covered with alder and hornbeam trees.

The hornbeam is a tree species native to Iran which can reach heights of between 15 and 25 m (49 and 82 ft), with a trunk bearing smooth, gray-green bark. The dead or moribund specimens protruding from the lake have suffered considerable decay from having been partially submerged in its waters for many years. Unlike the hornbeams, the alders are well-adapted to the wetland habitat of the lake and are thus in better health.

For all its strange beauty, the Lake of Ghosts has not yet been promoted seriously as a tourist attraction and, as yet, lacks any facilities which could make it such. It can be accessed only on rough roads requiring the use of four-wheel drive vehicles - and even then only safely at certain times of year.

== Media and related videos ==
Films and documentaries on the lake have been made or are being produced. One of these is named The Lake of Ghosts by Reza Jafari Jozani with Dr. Hesam Bani-Eghbal. Works of fiction inspired by the lake may include a novel of the same name written by Darren Shan, under the name of 'The Lake of Souls'.

== Gallery ==
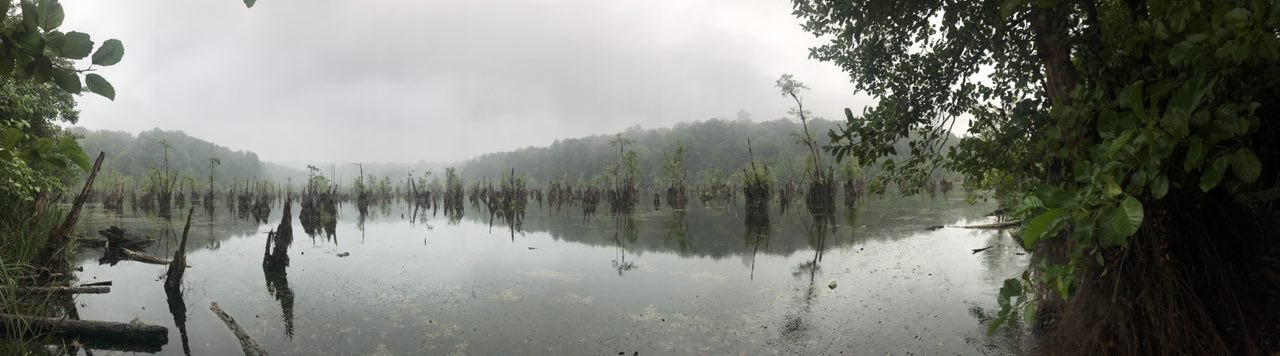
The Ghost Lake in Mazandaran - North of Iran

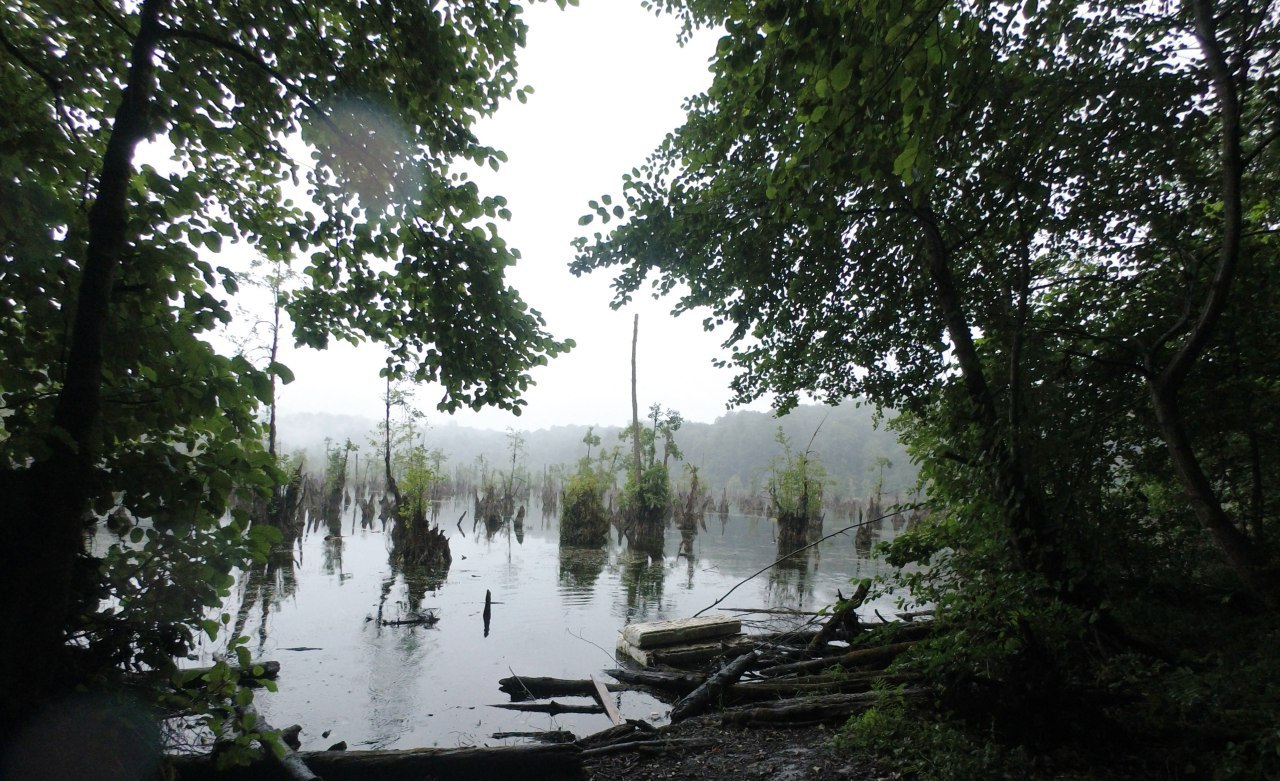
The Ghost Lake in Mazandaran - North of Iran

== See also ==
- Ghost Lake, Alberta
- Ghost Lake
- The Lake of Souls
