= Shalmash Falls =

Cluster of three waterfalls in Iran

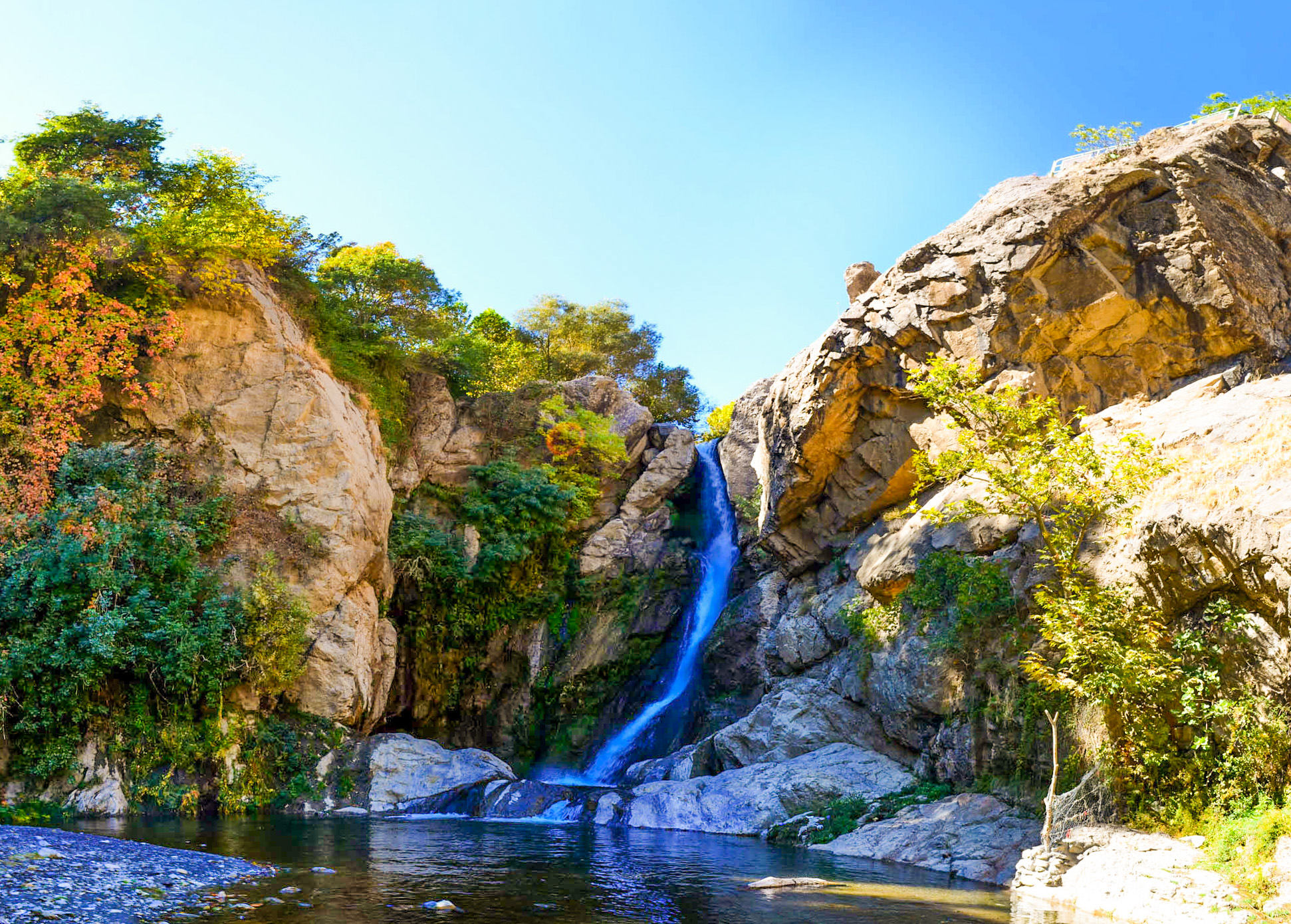
- Interactive map of Shalmash Falls
- Location: Sardasht, Iran
- Coordinates: 36.097973°N 45.493891°E
- Total height: 10 metres (33 ft)

Shalmash Falls is a cluster of three waterfalls situated on the outskirts of the City of Sardasht in the West Azerbaijan province of Iran. Near the border with Iraq, they can be easily viewed from stairs built for visitors to these waterfalls. The falls are each about 10 metres (33 ft) high. In addition to being a scenic site, their environs are used for recreation, including swimming. These falls are along a branch of the Little Zab River. The waterfalls are at their most substantial flow during the spring. The weather of the region is cold until the middle of spring.
