= Vanush =

Village in Mazandaran province, Iran

Vanush Persian: ونوش
- Village
- Location within Iran
- Coordinates: 36°33′35″N 51°51′44″E
- Country: Iran
- Province: Mazandaran
- County: Nowshahr
- District: Central
- Rural District: Kalej

Population (2016)
  - Total: 2,669
- Time zone: UTC+3:30 (IRST)

Vanush (Persian: ونوش) (Note: Also romanized as Vanoush, Vanūsh, Venoosh, and Venūsh) is a village in Kalej Rural District of the Central District in Nowshahr County, Mazandaran province, Iran.

== Demographics ==
=== Population ===
At the time of the 2006 National Census, the village's population was 2,483 in 679 households. The following census in 2011 counted 2,322 people in 703 households. The 2016 census measured the population of the village as 2,669 people in 875 households. It was the most populous village in its rural district.

== Mamraz Lake, the "Lake of Ghosts" ==
Vanush is the settlement closest to the Lake of Ghosts, a site of natural beauty featuring an eerie, drowned landscape of half-submerged hornbeam trees resembling phantoms in the mist.
