= Headwater of Bisotun =

Spring in Iran

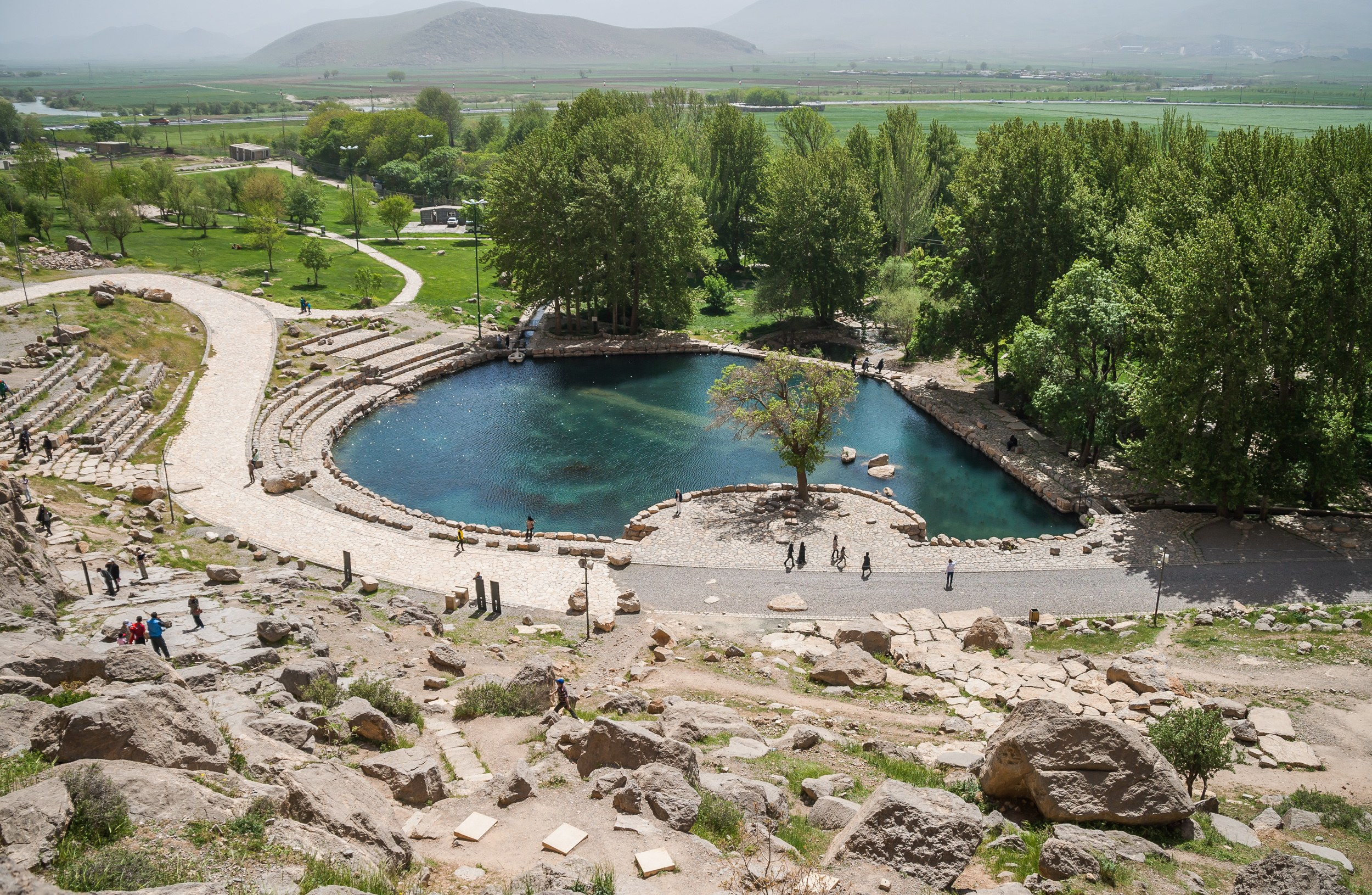

Headwater of Bisotun is a historical Headwater which located in the Ancient site of Bisotun city in Kermanshah Province of Iran. this Headwater listed in Iranian national heritages list on March 16, 2002. it also listed as Iranian national natural heritages on July 25, 2009. Headwater of Bisotun also irrigates nearby farms.
