= Shevi Waterfall =

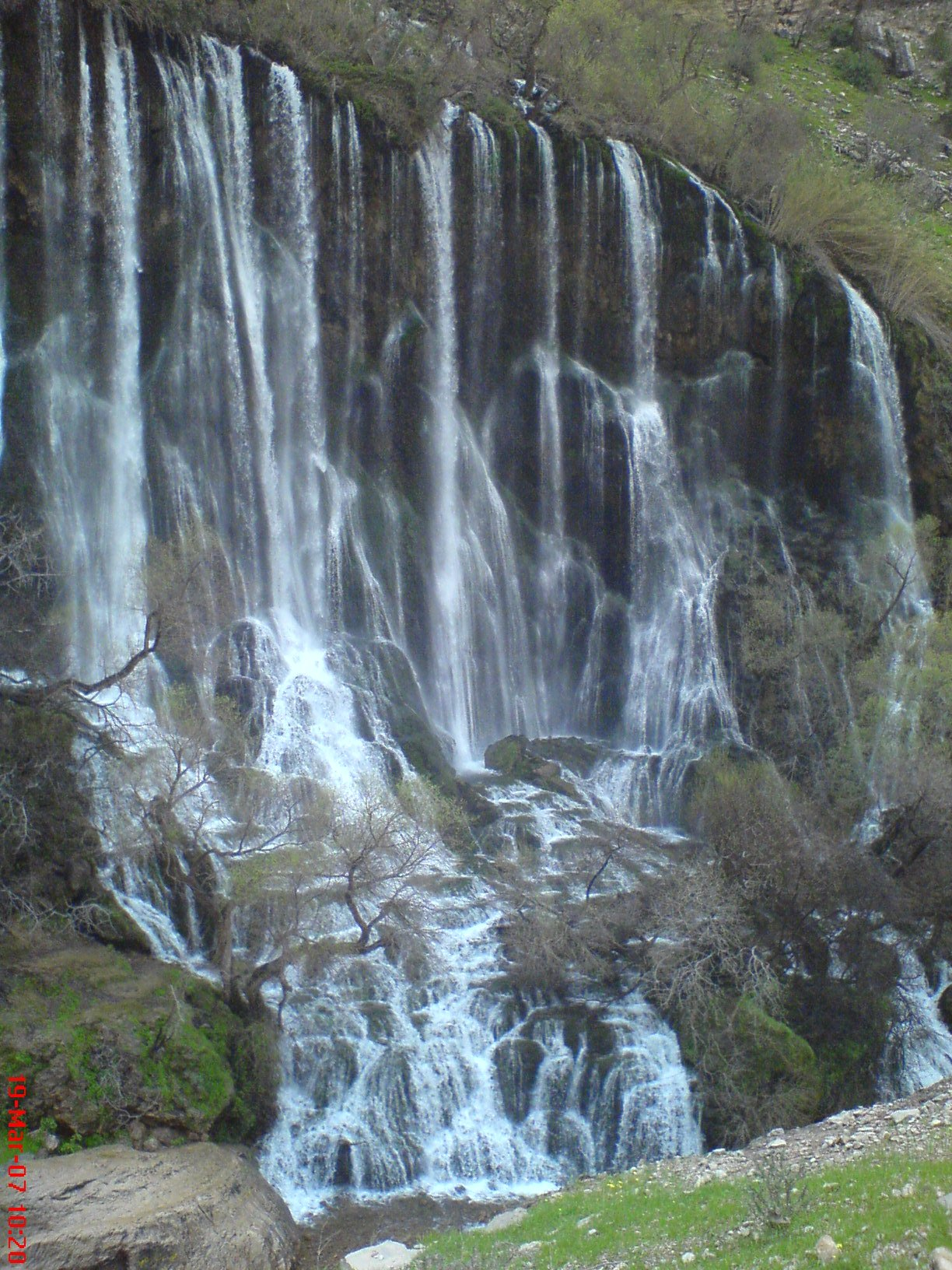
Shevi Waterfall

Shevi Waterfall is the largest natural waterfall in the Middle East. The geographical location of the waterfall is E484936 N324745, Zagros Mountains in a village called Shevi at Shahion district in Dezful City, of Iran's Khuzestan Province. Shevi Waterfall is located near Salon Mountains and is 65 km from the center of Shahion district and 110 km from Dezful City.

== Description of the waterfall ==
Coming out of a cave, the Shevi Waterfall flows down from a high gorge. The height of the waterfall is 85 meters, and its width is 70 meters. After crossing mountains and valleys, its water flows into the Dez River and finally into the Dez Dam Lake in Khuzestan Province.
