= Daryas =

Daryas درياس
- Village
- Location within Iran
- Coordinates: 31°43′36″N 50°19′37″E
- Country: Iran
- Province: Khuzestan
- County: Izeh
- Bakhsh: Dehdez
- Rural District: Dehdez

Population (2006)
  - Total: 139
- Time zone: UTC+3:30 (IRST)
  - Summer (DST): UTC+4:30 (IRDT)

Daryas (Persian: درياس, also Romanized as Daryās) is a village in Dehdez Rural District, Dehdez District, Izeh County, Khuzestan Province, Iran. At the 2006 census, its population was 139, in 25 families.
