= Khar Turan National Park =

National park of Iran

Coordinates: 36.5000°N 55.50000°E

UNESCO Biosphere Reserves in Iran

Khar Turan National Park and Touran Wildlife Refuge are adjoining protected areas in Iran. They are situated in the Semnan province, southeast of Shahrud. With a size of 1,400,000 hectares (14,000 km^{2}), They form the second-largest reserve in Iran. Khar Turan National Park also called the little Africa in Iran, is registered as the second biosphere reserve in the world by UNESCO (biosphere reserves are protected areas of ecosystems promoting solutions to reconcile the conservation of biodiversity with sustainable use), Turan National Park and Wildlife Refuge is one of the astonishing expanses to observe the mysteries of the wildlife accustomed to arid and semi-arid regions of Iran. Being the second-largest reserve in this country, this park embraces arid highlands, lowlands, mounts, sands, and endless salt pans.

== Fauna ==
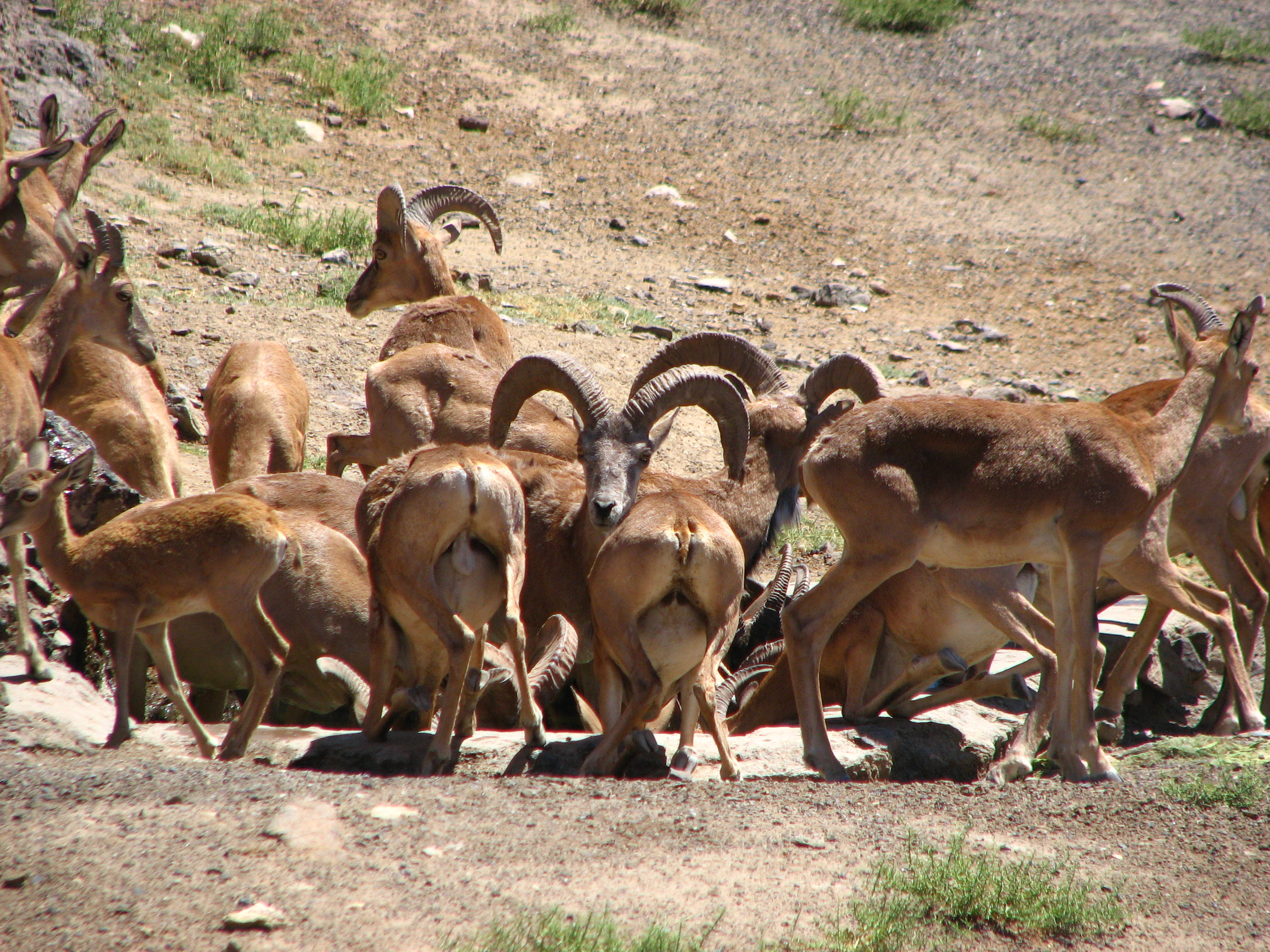

Khar Turan is home to several critically endangered species of animals including the Persian onager which is rare in the wild with around 600 individuals, the Ustyurt Mountain sheep, the Chinkara subspecies gazella bennettii shikarii, the Iranian ground jay, the Pale rockfinch, and one of the largest populations of the critically endangered Asiatic cheetah. There were about 12–15 of these cats in the area. Occasional reports of females with cubs indicate a breeding and perhaps growing population. In late December 2014, four new cheetahs have been spotted by camera traps. Another four new individuals consisting of a female and her three cubs had been reported in January 2015, after another eleven new cheetahs were spotted a month before, and an additional eight cheetahs had been spotted in July 2015. In April 2024, the largest known family group of Asiatic cheetahs in Iran was reported in Khar Turan National Park, consisting of a female and her five cubs.

== See also ==
- Kharturan Rural District
- Nayband Wildlife Sanctuary
- Turan
- Wildlife of Iran
