= Margan, Fars =

Margan مارگان
- Village
- Location within Iran
- Coordinates: 30°30′25″N 51°54′02″E
- Country: Iran
- Province: Fars
- County: Sepidan
- Bakhsh: Central
- Rural District: Komehr

Population (2006)
  - Total: 226
- Time zone: UTC+3:30 (IRST)
  - Summer (DST): UTC+4:30 (IRDT)

Margan (Persian: مارگان, also Romanized as Mārgān; also known as Mārgūn, Mārgūn-e Bālā, and Mūrgāh) is a village in Komehr Rural District, in the Central District of Sepidan County, Fars province, Iran. At the 2006 census, its population was 226, in 55 families.
