= Piran waterfall =

Coordinates: 34°29′36″N 45°57′18″E

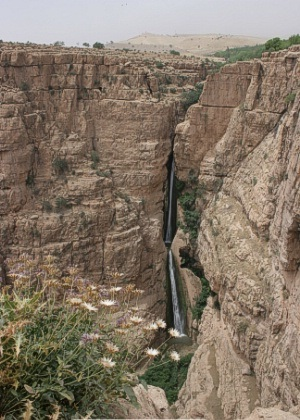

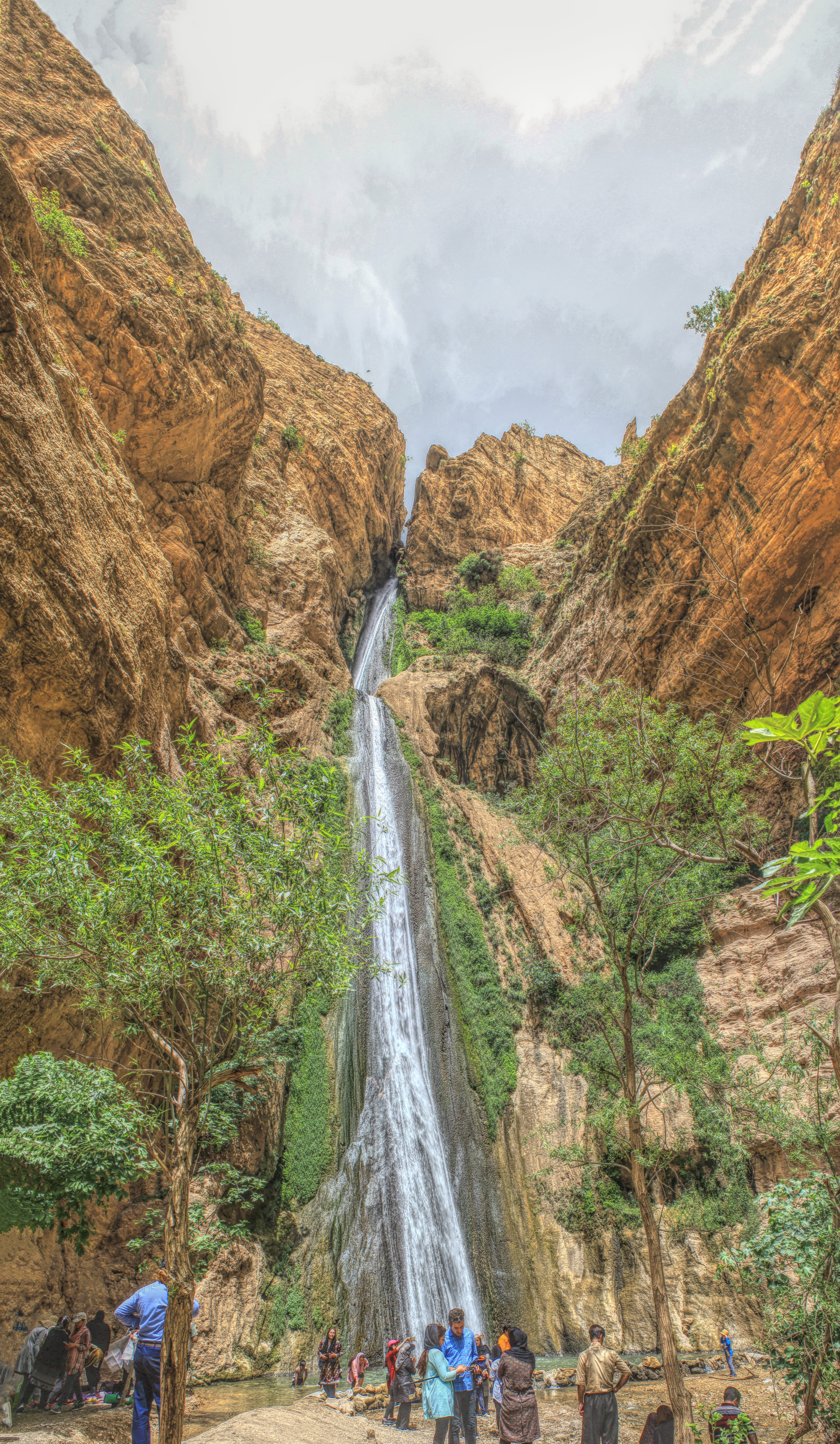

Piran waterfall or Rijab waterfall is located in Sarpol-e Zahab County Kermanshah Province.

The Piran waterfall is about 100 meters in height.
