= Nojian Waterfall =

Coordinates: 33.230577°N 48.574942°E

Nojian waterfall
- آبشار نوژیان
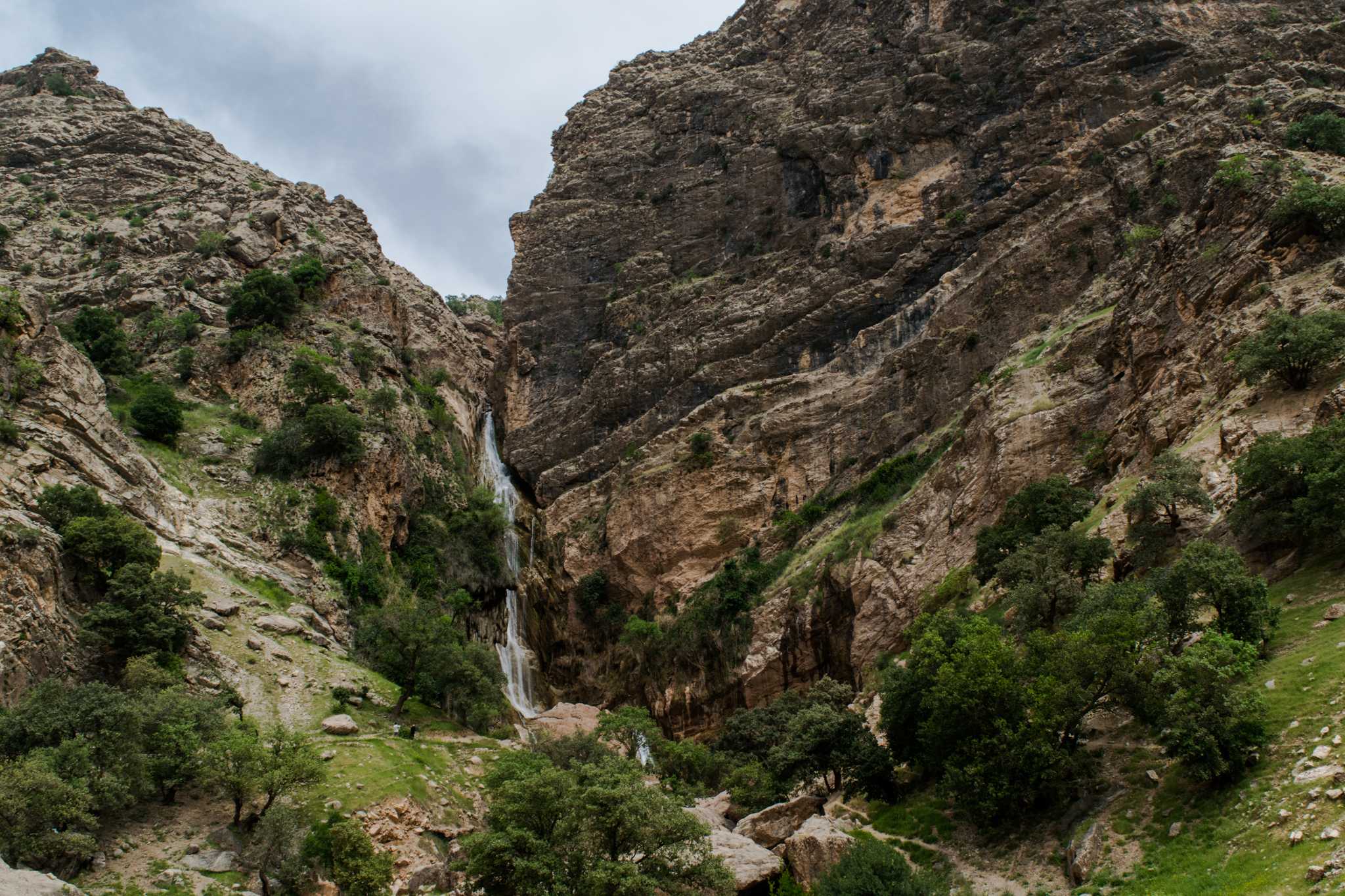
- Nojian waterfall
- Interactive map of Nojian waterfall
- Location: Papi District, Khorramabad County, Lorestan Province, Iran
- Longest drop: 95 metres (312 ft)
- Total width: 5

Nojian Waterfall (Persian: آبشار نوژیان) (in Luri: آوشار نوژیو) is one of the highest waterfalls in Iran. It is located in Khorramabad County in Lorestan Province, in the west of Iran.

The waterfall is located 38 kilometres (24 mi) southeast of Khorramabad. Its height is 95 metres (312 ft) and its width at the top is 5 metres (16 ft). Nozhian Waterfall was included on the Natural Heritage list by Cultural Heritage, Handicrafts and Tourism Organization of Iran on 27 March 2008.

== Description ==
The Forest Resort of Nojian is located on the top of the Taff Mountains. There are many medicinal herbs growing in the Taff Mountains, with a large range of wild plants. Many visitors come to the area to see the waterfall and collect medicinal plants. The route to Nojian is from Khorramabad on the Nojian asphalted road, or by railway to the country station and after that, about two hours hiking is required to reach the waterfall.

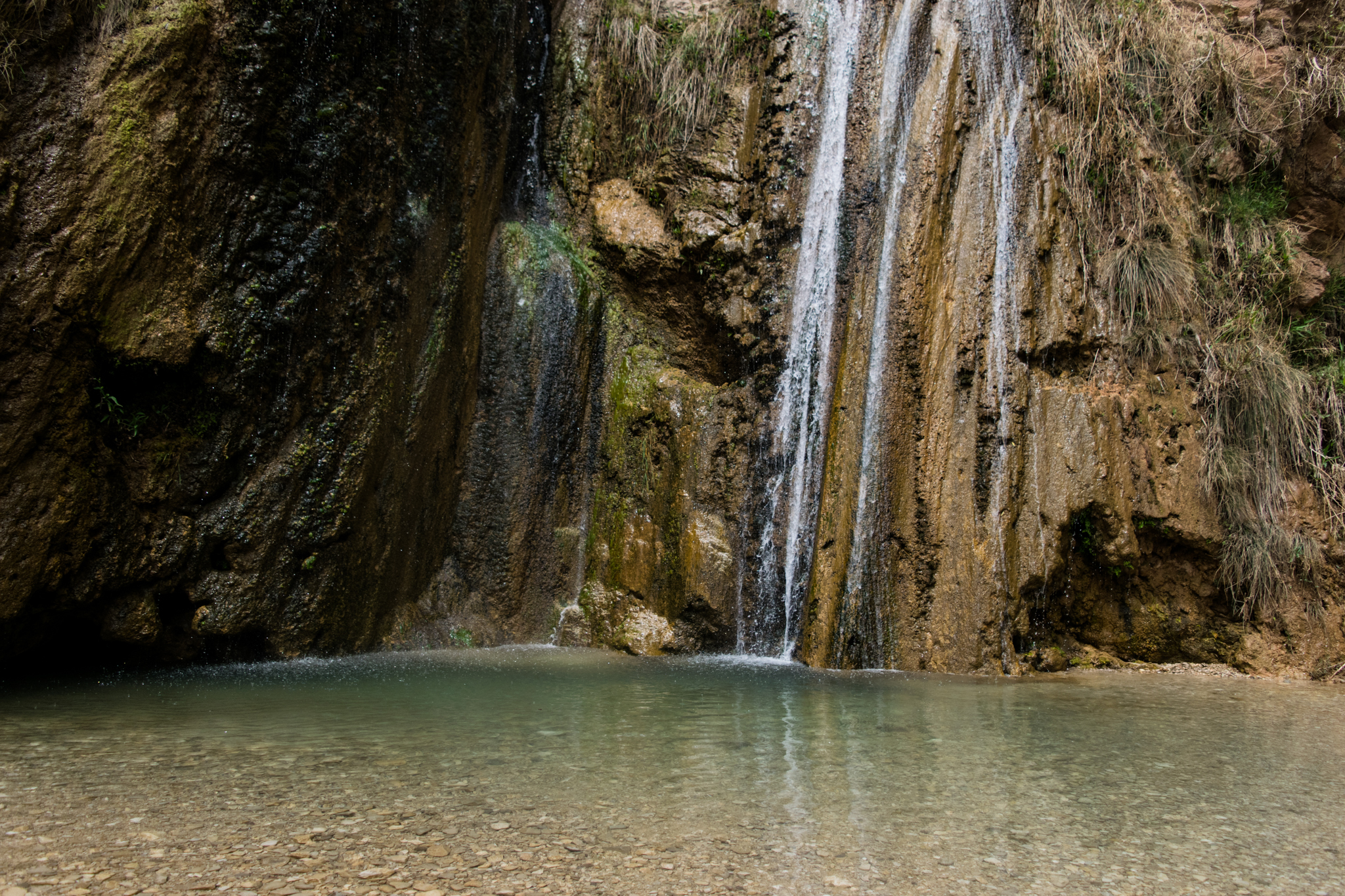
Part of Nojian Waterfall.

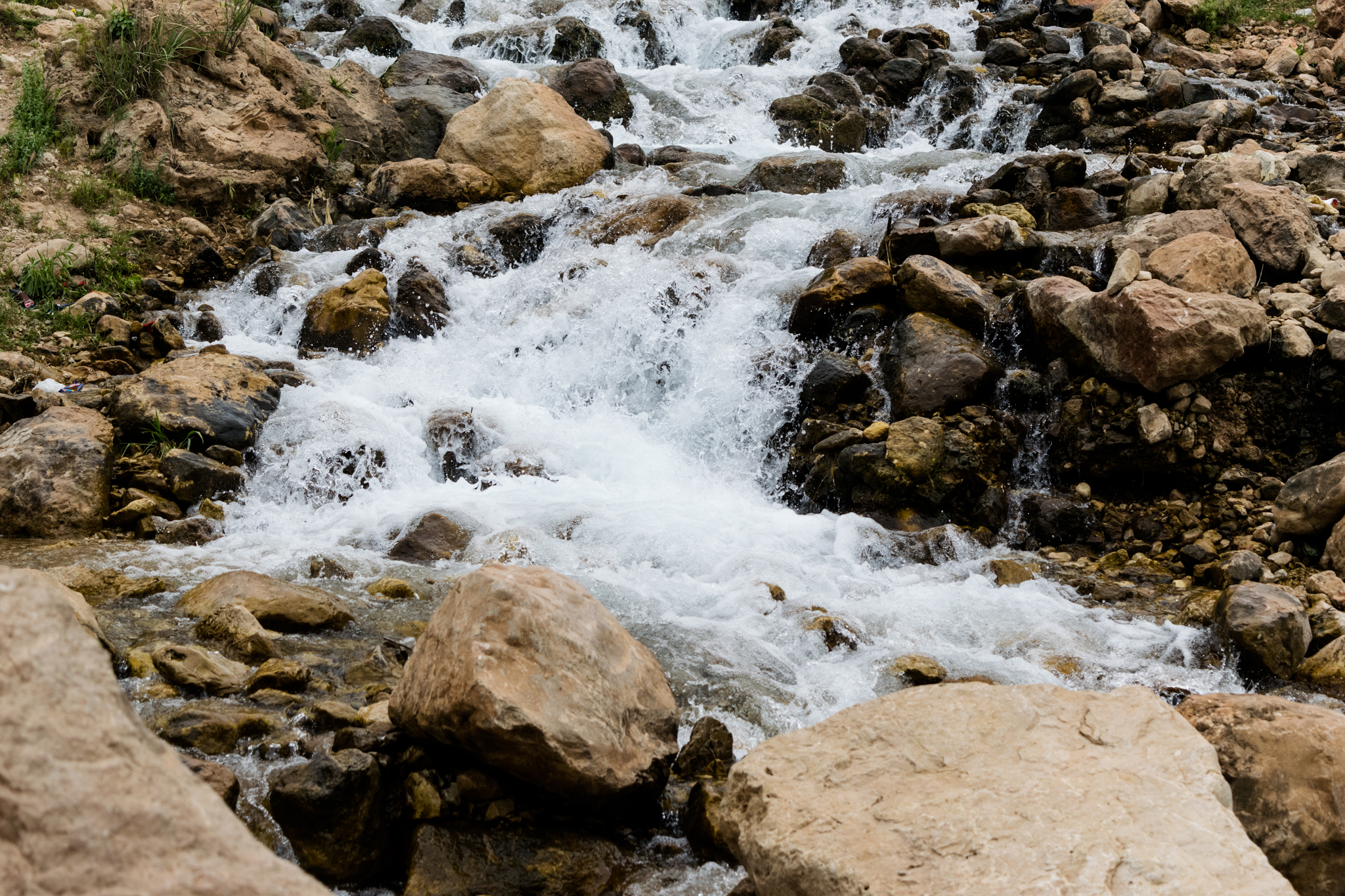
Part of Nojian Waterfall.

== See also ==
- List of waterfalls
