= Sang Sara =

Sang Sara (Persian: سنگ سرا) may refer to:

- Sang Sara, Gilan
- Sang Sara, Mazandaran
