= Shariatabad, Nowshahr =

Shariatabad شريعت آباد
- Village
- Location within Iran
- Coordinates: 36°40′00″N 51°27′00″E
- Country: Iran
- Province: Mazandaran
- County: Nowshahr
- Bakhsh: Central
- Rural District: Kheyrud Kenar

Population (2016)
  - Total: 251
- Time zone: UTC+3:30 (IRST)

Shariatabad (Persian: شريعت آباد, also Romanized as Sharī‘atābād) is a coastal suburb of Nowshahr city and a village in Kheyrud Kenar Rural District, in the Central District of Nowshahr County, Mazandaran Province, Iran.

At the time of the 2006 National Census, the village's population was 261 in 73 households. The following census in 2011 counted 202 people in 64 households. The 2016 census measured the population of the village as 251 people in 91 households.
