= Kohneh Sara =

Kohneh Sara (Persian: كهنه سرا) may refer to:

- Kohneh Sara, Gilan
- Kohneh Sara, Mazandaran
