= Shahr-e Posht =

Shahr-e Posht شهرپشت
- Village
- Interactive map of Shahr-e Posht
- Coordinates: 36°38′06″N 51°29′56″E
- Country: Iran
- Province: Mazandaran
- County: Nowshahr
- Bakhsh: Central
- Rural District: Kheyrud Kenar

Population (2016)
  - Total: 274
- Time zone: UTC+3:30 (IRST)

Shahr-e Posht (Persian: شهرپشت) is a suburb of Nowshahr city and a village in Kheyrud Kenar Rural District, in the Central District of Nowshahr County, Mazandaran Province, Iran. Parts of the village became a neighborhood of Nowshahr city.

At the time of the 2006 National Census, the village's population was 525 in 142 households. The following census in 2011 counted 273 people in 73 households. The 2016 census measured the population of the village as 273 people in 86 households.
