= Mianak =

Mianak (Persian: ميانك) may refer to:

- Mianak, Babol
- Mianak, Chalus
- Mianak, Nowshahr
