= Hamzeh Deh =

Hamzeh Deh (Persian: حمزه ده) may refer to:

- Hamzeh Deh-e Olya
- Hamzeh Deh-e Sofla
