= Farrash Kola =

Farrash Kola (Persian: فراشكلا) may refer to:

- Farrash Kola-ye Olya
- Farrash Kola-ye Sofla
