= Aliabad-e Asgarkhan =

Village in Mazandaran province, Iran

Aliabad-e Asgarkhan Persian: علي ابادعسگرخان
- Village
- Location within Iran
- Coordinates: 36°34′55″N 51°45′45″E
- Country: Iran
- Province: Mazandaran
- County: Nowshahr
- District: Central
- Rural District: Baladeh Kojur

Population (2016)
  - Total: 1,783
- Time zone: UTC+3:30 (IRST)

Aliabad-e Asgarkhan (Persian: علي ابادعسگرخان) (Note: Also romanized as ‘Alīābād-e ‘Asgarkhān; also known as ‘Alīābād and ‘Alīābād-e ‘Askarkhān) is a village in Baladeh Kojur Rural District of the Central District in Nowshahr County, Mazandaran province, Iran.

== Demographics ==
=== Population ===
At the time of the 2006 National Census, the village's population was 1,680 in 458 households. The following census in 2011 counted 1,627 people in 507 households. The 2016 census measured the population of the village as 1,783 people in 582 households.
