= Latingan =

Village in Mazandaran province, Iran

Latingan Persian: لتينگان
- Village
- Location within Iran
- Coordinates: 36°37′49″N 51°32′42″E
- Country: Iran
- Province: Mazandaran
- County: Nowshahr
- District: Central
- Rural District: Kheyrud Kenar

Population (2016)
  - Total: 1,508
- Time zone: UTC+3:30 (IRST)

Latingan (Persian: لتينگان) (Note: Also romanized as Latīngān; also known as Lītangān) is a village in Kheyrud Kenar Rural District of the Central District in Nowshahr County, Mazandaran province, Iran.

== Demographics ==
=== Population ===
At the time of the 2006 National Census, the village's population was 1,313 in 369 households. The following census in 2011 counted 1,197 people in 367 households. The 2016 census measured the population of the village as 1,508 people in 493 households.
