= Toskatok =

Village in Mazandaran province, Iran

Toskatok Persian: تسكاتك
- Village
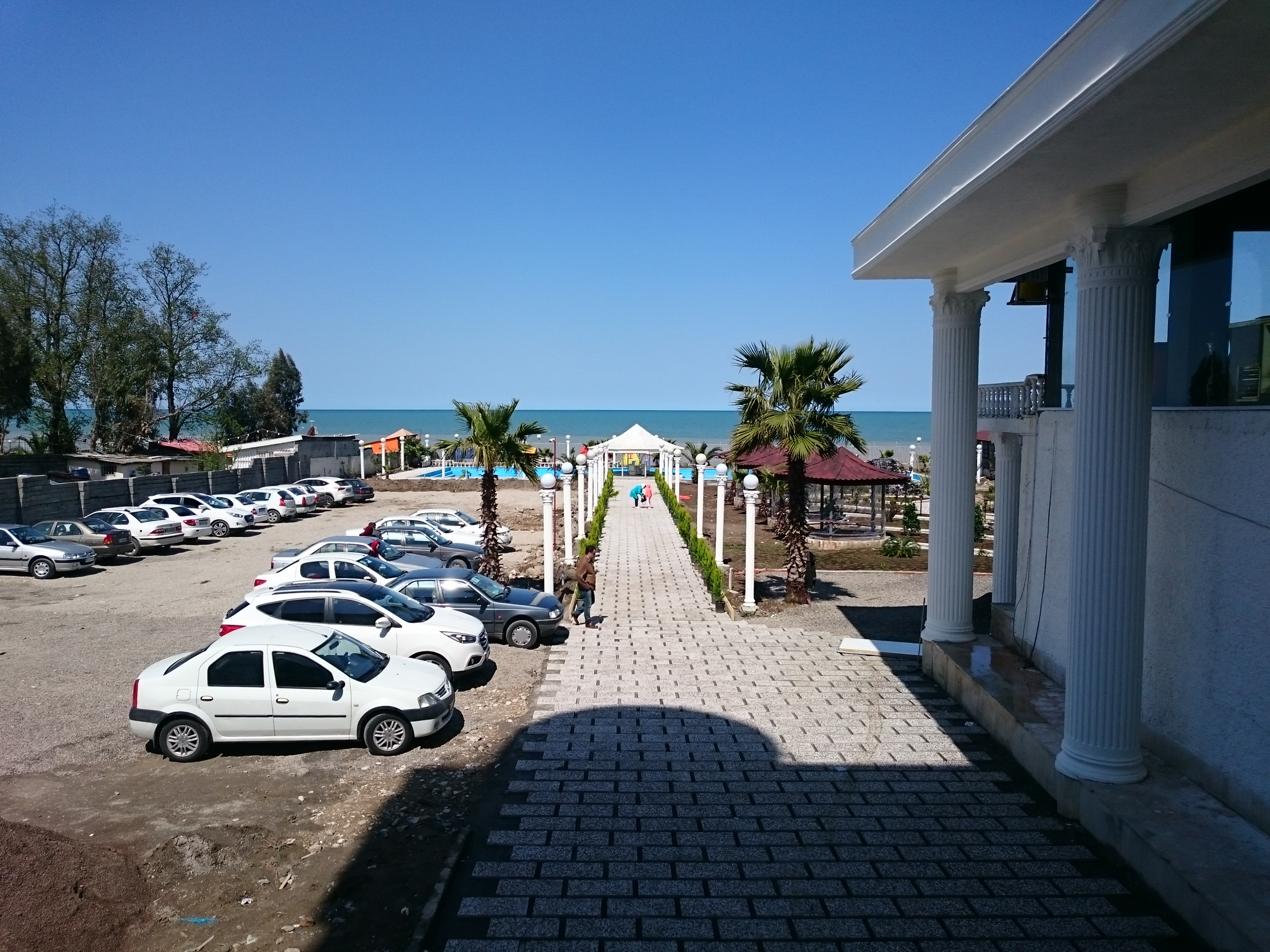
- Parking area at the beach in the village of Toskatok

- Location within Iran
- Coordinates: 36°35′01″N 51°46′53″E
- Country: Iran
- Province: Mazandaran
- County: Nowshahr
- District: Central
- Rural District: Baladeh Kojur

Population (2016)
  - Total: 1,583
- Time zone: UTC+3:30 (IRST)

Toskatok (Persian: تسکاتک) (Note: Also romanized as Toskātok; also known as Tūskātok (توسکاتک) and Tūskātūk (توسکاتوک)) is a village in Baladeh Kojur Rural District of the Central District in Nowshahr County, Mazandaran province, Iran.

== Demographics ==
=== Population ===
At the time of the 2006 National Census, the village's population was 1,423 in 376 households. The following census in 2011 counted 1,353 people in 413 households. The 2016 census measured the population of the village as 1,583 people in 503 households.
