= Tazehabad, Nowshahr =

Village in Mazandaran province, Iran

Tazehabad Persian: تازه اباد
- Village
- Location within Iran
- Coordinates: 36°37′53″N 51°29′09″E
- Country: Iran
- Province: Mazandaran
- County: Nowshahr
- District: Central
- Rural District: Kheyrud Kenar

Population (2016)
  - Total: 5,029
- Time zone: UTC+3:30 (IRST)

Tazehabad (Persian: تازه اباد) (Note: Also romanized as Tāzehābād) is a village in Kheyrud Kenar Rural District of the Central District in Nowshahr County, Mazandaran province, Iran.

== Demographics ==
=== Population ===
At the time of the 2006 National Census, the village's population was 2,735 in 737 households. The following census in 2011 counted 3,503 people in 1,078 households. The 2016 census measured the population of the village as 5,029 people in 1,586 households. It was the most populous village in its rural district.
