= Chilak-e Sofla =

Chilak-e Sofla چیلک سفلی
- Village
- Location within Iran
- Coordinates: 36°35′43″N 51°38′20″E
- Country: Iran
- Province: Mazandaran
- County: Nowshahr
- Bakhsh: Central
- Rural District: Baladeh Kojur

Population (2016)
  - Total: 569
- Time zone: UTC+3:30 (IRST)

Chilak-e Sofla (Persian: چیلک سفلی, also Romanized as Chīlak-e Soflá; also known as Chīlak-e Pā’īn) is a village in Baladeh Kojur Rural District, in the Central District of Nowshahr County, Mazandaran Province, Iran.

At the time of the 2006 National Census, the village's population was 765 in 197 households. The following census in 2011 counted 642 people in 193 households. The 2016 census measured the population of the village as 569 people in 181 households.
