= Sang-e Tajan =

Village in Mazandaran province, Iran

Sang-e Tajan Persian: سنگ تجن
- Village
- Location within Iran
- Coordinates: 36°37′28″N 51°29′40″E
- Country: Iran
- Province: Mazandaran
- County: Nowshahr
- District: Central
- Rural District: Kheyrud Kenar

Population (2016)
  - Total: 2,148
- Time zone: UTC+3:30 (IRST)

Sang-e Tajan (Persian: سنگ تجن) is a village in Kheyrud Kenar Rural District of the Central District in Nowshahr County, Mazandaran province, Iran.

== Demographics ==
=== Population ===
At the time of the 2006 National Census, the village's population was 1,098 in 281 households. The following census in 2011 counted 1,719 people in 510 households. The 2016 census measured the population of the village as 2,148 people in 678 households.
