= Siah Rud, Mazandaran =

Siah Rud سياه رود
- Village
- Location within Iran
- Coordinates: 36°33′31″N 51°56′09″E
- Country: Iran
- Province: Mazandaran
- County: Nowshahr
- Bakhsh: Central
- Rural District: Kalej

Population (2016)
  - Total: 303
- Time zone: UTC+3:30 (IRST)

Siah Rud (Persian: سياه رود, also Romanized as Sīāh Rūd) is a village in Kalej Rural District, in the Central District of Nowshahr County, Mazandaran Province, Iran.

At the time of the 2006 National Census, the village's population was 370 in 108 households. The following census in 2011 counted 301 people in 95 households. The 2016 census measured the population of the village as 303 people in 102 households.
