= Khezr-e Tireh =

Village in Mazandaran province, Iran

Khezr-e Tireh Persian: خضرتيره
- Village
- Location within Iran
- Coordinates: 36°32′43″N 51°52′41″E
- Country: Iran
- Province: Mazandaran
- County: Nowshahr
- District: Central
- Rural District: Kalej

Population (2016)
  - Total: 900
- Time zone: UTC+3:30 (IRST)

Khezr-e Tireh (Persian: خضرتيره) (Note: Also romanized as Kheẕr-e Tīreh) is a village in Kalej Rural District of the Central District in Nowshahr County, Mazandaran province, Iran.

== Demographics ==
=== Population ===
At the time of the 2006 National Census, the village's population was 832 in 218 households. The following census in 2011 counted 841 people in 242 households. The 2016 census measured the population of the village as 900 people in 297 households.
