= Pasha Kola, Nowshahr =

Village in Mazandaran province, Iran

Pasha Kola Persian: پاشاكلا
- Village
- Location within Iran
- Coordinates: 36°32′54″N 51°52′32″E
- Country: Iran
- Province: Mazandaran
- County: Nowshahr
- District: Central
- Rural District: Kalej

Population (2016)
  - Total: 885
- Time zone: UTC+3:30 (IRST)

Pasha Kola (Persian: پاشاكلا) (Note: Also romanized as Pāshā Kolā) is a village in Kalej Rural District of the Central District in Nowshahr County, Mazandaran province, Iran.

== Demographics ==
=== Population ===
At the time of the 2006 National Census, the village's population was 719 in 192 households. The following census in 2011 counted 814 people in 241 households. The 2016 census measured the population of the village as 885 people in 287 households.
