= Kurkursar-e Olya =

Village in Mazandaran province, Iran

Kurkursar-e Olya Persian: كوركورسرعليا
- Village
- Location within Iran
- Coordinates: 36°38′49″N 51°28′38″E
- Country: Iran
- Province: Mazandaran
- County: Nowshahr
- District: Central
- Rural District: Kheyrud Kenar

Population (2016)
  - Total: 1,115
- Time zone: UTC+3:30 (IRST)

Kurkursar-e Olya (Persian: كوركورسرعليا) (Note: Also romanized as Kūrkūrsar-e ‘Olyā; also known as Kerkerūsar-e Bālā and Korkorūdsar-e Bālā) is a village in Kheyrud Kenar Rural District of the Central District in Nowshahr County, Mazandaran province, Iran.

== Demographics ==
=== Population ===
At the time of the 2006 National Census, the village's population was 590 in 159 households. The following census in 2011 counted 760 people in 236 households. The 2016 census measured the population of the village as 1,115 people in 358 households.
