= Koshk-e Sara =

Village in Mazandaran province, Iran

Koshk-e Sara Persian: كشك سرا
- Village
- Location within Iran
- Coordinates: 36°37′57″N 51°27′23″E
- Country: Iran
- Province: Mazandaran
- County: Nowshahr
- District: Central
- Rural District: Kheyrud Kenar

Population (2016)
  - Total: 4,157
- Time zone: UTC+3:30 (IRST)

Koshk-e Sara (Persian: كشك سرا) (Note: Also romanized as Koshk-e Sarā; also known as Khoshg Sar and Khoshk-e Sarā) is a village in Kheyrud Kenar Rural District of the Central District in Nowshahr County, Mazandaran province, Iran.

== Demographics ==
=== Population ===
At the time of the 2006 National Census, the village's population was 3,428 in 903 households. The following census in 2011 counted 3,821 people in 1,181 households. The 2016 census measured the population of the village as 4,157 people in 1,377 households.
