= Salah ol Din Kola =

Village in Mazandaran province, Iran

Salah ol Din Kola Persian: صلاح الدين كلا
- Village
- Location within Iran
- Coordinates: 36°33′50″N 51°50′05″E
- Country: Iran
- Province: Mazandaran
- County: Nowshahr
- District: Central
- Rural District: Baladeh Kojur

Population (2016)
  - Total: 2,593
- Time zone: UTC+3:30 (IRST)

Salah ol Din Kola (Persian: صلاح الدين كلا) (Note: Also romanized as Salāh ol Dīn Kolā; also known as Şalaḩ ed Dīn Kolā-ye ‘Olyā, Şalāḩ od Dīn Kalā-ye ‘Olyā, Şalāḩ od Dīn Kolā, Şalaḩ od Dīn Kolā-ye ‘Olyā, Salāheddin Kalā, and Salahoddin Kola) is a village in Baladeh Kojur Rural District of the Central District in Nowshahr County, Mazandaran province, Iran.

== Demographics ==
=== Population ===
At the time of the 2006 National Census, the village's population was 2,370 in 612 households. The following census in 2011 counted 2,401 people in 727 households. The 2016 census measured the population of the village as 2,593 people in 837 households. It was the most populous village in its rural district.
