= Molla Kola, Nowshahr =

Molla Kola ملاكلا
- Village
- Location within Iran
- Coordinates: 36°33′22″N 51°48′26″E
- Country: Iran
- Province: Mazandaran
- County: Nowshahr
- Bakhsh: Central
- Rural District: Baladeh Kojur

Population (2016)
  - Total: 512
- Time zone: UTC+3:30 (IRST)

Molla Kola (Persian: ملاكلا, also Romanized as Mollā Kolā) is a village in Baladeh Kojur Rural District, in the Central District of Nowshahr County, Mazandaran Province, Iran.

At the time of the 2006 National Census, the village's population was 436 in 102 households. The following census in 2011 counted 433 people in 134 households. The 2016 census measured the population of the village as 512 people in 165 households.
