= Manuchehr Kola =

Manuchehr Kola منوچهركلا
- Village
- Location within Iran
- Coordinates: 36°32′29″N 51°54′24″E
- Country: Iran
- Province: Mazandaran
- County: Nowshahr
- Bakhsh: Central
- Rural District: Kalej

Population (2016)
  - Total: 784
- Time zone: UTC+3:30 (IRST)

Manuchehr Kola (Persian: منوچهركلا, also Romanized as Manūchehr Kolā) is a village in Kalej Rural District, in the Central District of Nowshahr County, Mazandaran Province, Iran.

At the time of the 2006 National Census, the village's population was 640 in 173 households. The following census in 2011 counted 803 people in 233 households. The 2016 census measured the population of the village as 784 people in 261 households.
