= Kheyr Sar =

Village in Mazandaran province, Iran

Kheyr Sar Persian: خيرسر
- Village
- Location within Iran
- Coordinates: 36°37′32″N 51°29′08″E
- Country: Iran
- Province: Mazandaran
- County: Nowshahr
- District: Central
- Rural District: Kheyrud Kenar

Population (2016)
  - Total: 1,459
- Time zone: UTC+3:30 (IRST)

Kheyr Sar (Persian: خيرسر) (Note: Also romanized as Khir Sar and Khīr Sar; also known as Kareh Sar, Kashk Sarā, and Khīreh Sar) is a village in Kheyrud Kenar Rural District of the Central District in Nowshahr County, Mazandaran province, Iran.

== Demographics ==
=== Population ===
At the time of the 2006 National Census, the village's population was 1,261 in 308 households. The following census in 2011 counted 1,645 people in 489 households. The 2016 census measured the population of the village as 1,459 people in 462 households.
