= Hasanabad, Nowshahr =

Village in Mazandaran province, Iran

Hasanabad Persian: حسن آباد
- Village
- Location within Iran
- Coordinates: 36°33′48″N 51°55′40″E
- Country: Iran
- Province: Mazandaran
- County: Nowshahr
- District: Central
- Rural District: Kalej

Population (2016)
  - Total: 1,120
- Time zone: UTC+3:30 (IRST)

Hasanabad (Persian: حسن آباد) (Note: Also romanized as Ḩasanābād; also known as Gassan-Abad) is a village in Kalej Rural District of the Central District in Nowshahr County, Mazandaran province, Iran. Hasanabad is on the Caspian Sea.

== Demographics ==
=== Population ===
At the time of the 2006 National Census, the village's population was 1,099 in 301 households. The following census in 2011 counted 1,126 people in 342 households. The 2016 census measured the population of the village as 1,120 people in 362 households.
