= Dizer Kola =

Dizer Kola ديزركلا
- Village
- Location within Iran
- Coordinates: 36°33′25″N 51°47′38″E
- Country: Iran
- Province: Mazandaran
- County: Nowshahr
- Bakhsh: Central
- Rural District: Baladeh Kojur

Population (2016)
  - Total: 287
- Time zone: UTC+3:30 (IRST)

Dizer Kola (Persian: ديزركلا, also Romanized as Dīzer Kolā) is a village in Baladeh Kojur Rural District, in the Central District of Nowshahr County, Mazandaran Province, Iran.

At the time of the 2006 National Census, the village's population was 250 in 64 households. The following census in 2011 counted 171 people in 48 households. The 2016 census measured the population of the village as 287 people in 92 households.
