= Margir Deh =

Margir Deh مارگيرده
- Village
- Location within Iran
- Coordinates: 36°37′19″N 51°33′55″E
- Country: Iran
- Province: Mazandaran
- County: Nowshahr
- Bakhsh: Central
- Rural District: Kheyrud Kenar

Population (2016)
  - Total: 547
- Time zone: UTC+3:30 (IRST)

Margir Deh (Persian: مارگيرده, also Romanized as Mārgīr Deh) is a village in Kheyrud Kenar Rural District, in the Central District of Nowshahr County, Mazandaran Province, Iran.

At the time of the 2006 National Census, the village's population was 401 in 101 households. The following census in 2011 counted 499 people in 143 households. The 2016 census measured the population of the village as 547 people in 174 households.
