= Najjar Deh =

Najjar Deh نجارده
- Village
- Location within Iran
- Coordinates: 36°36′42″N 51°34′20″E
- Country: Iran
- Province: Mazandaran
- County: Nowshahr
- Bakhsh: Central
- Rural District: Kheyrud Kenar

Population (2016)
  - Total: 608
- Time zone: UTC+3:30 (IRST)

Najjar Deh (Persian: نجارده, also Romanized as Najjār Deh) is a village in Kheyrud Kenar Rural District, in the Central District of Nowshahr County, Mazandaran Province, Iran.

At the time of the 2006 National Census, the village's population was 659 in 170 households. The following census in 2011 counted 643 people in 193 households. The 2016 census measured the population of the village as 608 people in 203 households.
