= Alvi Kola, Nowshahr =

Village in Mazandaran province, Iran

Alvi Kola Persian: علويكلا
- Village
- Location within Iran
- Coordinates: 36°33′31″N 51°53′47″E
- Country: Iran
- Province: Mazandaran
- County: Nowshahr
- District: Central
- Rural District: Kalej

Population (2016)
  - Total: 1,419
- Time zone: UTC+3:30 (IRST)

Alvi Kola (Persian: علويكلا) (Note: Also romanized as ‘Alvī Kolā and ‘Olvī Kalā) is a village in Kalej Rural District of the Central District in Nowshahr County, Mazandaran province, Iran.

== Demographics ==
=== Population ===
At the time of the 2006 National Census, the village's population was 1,144 in 313 households. The following census in 2011 counted 1,269 people in 378 households. The 2016 census measured the population of the village as 1,419 people in 456 households.
