= Chalandar =

Village in Mazandaran province, Iran

Chalandar Persian: چلندر
- Village
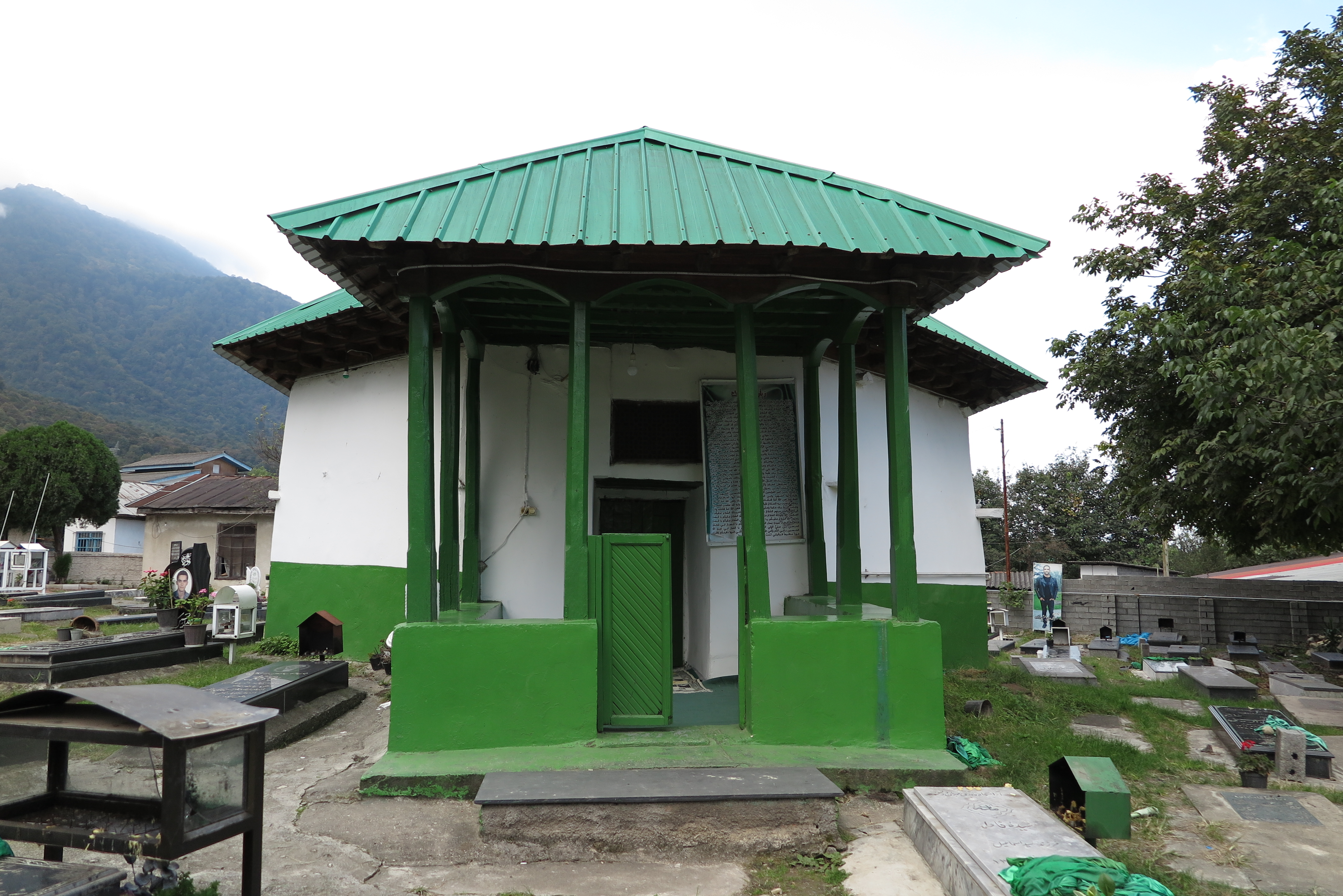
- Imamzadeh Noah in the village of Chalandar

- Location within Iran
- Coordinates: 36°34′29″N 51°41′20″E
- Country: Iran
- Province: Mazandaran
- County: Nowshahr
- District: Central
- Rural District: Baladeh Kojur

Population (2016)
  - Total: 1,427
- Time zone: UTC+3:30 (IRST)

Chalandar (Persian: چلندر) (Note: Also romanized as Chelandar) is a village in Baladeh Kojur Rural District of the Central District in Nowshahr County, Mazandaran province, Iran.

== Demographics ==
=== Population ===
At the time of the 2006 National Census, the village's population was 1,383 in 315 households. The following census in 2011 counted 1,272 people in 338 households. The 2016 census measured the population of the village as 1,427 people in 422 households.
