= Pey Kola =

Village in Mazandaran province, Iran

Pey Kola Persian: پيكلا
- Village
- Location within Iran
- Coordinates: 36°34′03″N 51°49′53″E
- Country: Iran
- Province: Mazandaran
- County: Nowshahr
- District: Central
- Rural District: Baladeh Kojur

Population (2016)
  - Total: 1,051
- Time zone: UTC+3:30 (IRST)

Pey Kola (Persian: پيكلا) (Note: Also romanized as Pey Kolā) is a village in Baladeh Kojur Rural District of the Central District in Nowshahr County, Mazandaran province, Iran.

== Demographics ==
=== Population ===
At the time of the 2006 National Census, the village's population was 977 in 261 households. The following census in 2011 counted 950 people in 284 households. The 2016 census measured the population of the village as 1,051 people in 343 households.
