= Neyrang =

Village in Mazandaran province, Iran

Neyrang Persian: نيرنگ
- Village
- Location within Iran
- Coordinates: 36°37′20″N 51°28′34″E
- Country: Iran
- Province: Mazandaran
- County: Nowshahr
- District: Central
- Rural District: Kheyrud Kenar

Population (2016)
  - Total: 2,972
- Time zone: UTC+3:30 (IRST)

Neyrang (Persian: نيرنگ) is a village in Kheyrud Kenar Rural District of the Central District in Nowshahr County, Mazandaran province, Iran.

== Demographics ==
=== Population ===
At the time of the 2006 National Census, the village's population was 1,912 in 511 households. The following census in 2011 counted 1,913 people in 573 households. The 2016 census measured the population of the village as 2,972 people in 924 households.
