= Amir Rud =

Village in Mazandaran province, Iran

Amir Rud Persian: اميررود
- Village
- Location within Iran
- Coordinates: 36°37′48″N 51°33′54″E
- Country: Iran
- Province: Mazandaran
- County: Nowshahr
- District: Central
- Rural District: Kheyrud Kenar

Population (2016)
  - Total: 1,150
- Time zone: UTC+3:30 (IRST)

Amir Rud (Persian: اميررود) (Note: Also romanized as Amīr Rūd and Amirud) is a village in Kheyrud Kenar Rural District of the Central District in Nowshahr County, Mazandaran province, Iran.

== Demographics ==
=== Population ===
At the time of the 2006 National Census, the village's population was 1,125 in 315 households. The following census in 2011 counted 822 people in 253 households. The 2016 census measured the population of the village as 1,150 people in 388 households.
