= Sangtu =

Sangtu may refer to:

- Sangtu (topknot), a type of topknot worn by Korean married men
- Sangtu (village), an Iranian village
