= Ezzat =

Village in Mazandaran province, Iran

Ezzat Persian: عزت
- Village
- Location within Iran
- Coordinates: 36°32′38″N 51°55′02″E
- Country: Iran
- Province: Mazandaran
- County: Nowshahr
- District: Central
- Rural District: Kalej

Population (2016)
  - Total: 962
- Time zone: UTC+3:30 (IRST)

Ezzat (Persian: عزت) (Note: Also romanized as ‘Ezzat) is a village in Kalej Rural District of the Central District in Nowshahr County, Mazandaran province, Iran.

== Demographics ==
=== Population ===
At the time of the 2006 National Census, the village's population was 729 in 179 households. The following census in 2011 counted 896 people in 266 households. The 2016 census measured the population of the village as 962 people in 300 households.
