= Seyyed Ali-ye Kiasoltan =

Village in Mazandaran province, Iran

Seyyed Ali-ye Kiasoltan Persian: سيدعلي كياسلطان
- Village
- Location within Iran
- Coordinates: 36°37′02″N 51°34′07″E
- Country: Iran
- Province: Mazandaran
- County: Nowshahr
- District: Central
- Rural District: Kheyrud Kenar

Population (2016)
  - Total: 1,077
- Time zone: UTC+3:30 (IRST)

Seyyed Ali-ye Kiasoltan (Persian: سيدعلي كياسلطان) (Note: Also romanized as Seyyed ‘Alī-ye Kīāsolţān) is a village in Kheyrud Kenar Rural District of the Central District in Nowshahr County, Mazandaran province, Iran.

== Demographics ==
=== Population ===
At the time of the 2006 National Census, the village's population was 1,144 in 311 households. The following census in 2011 counted 1,214 people in 382 households. The 2016 census measured the population of the village as 1,077 people in 356 households.
