= Mazga =

Village in Mazandaran province, Iran

Mazga Persian: مزگا
- Village
- Location within Iran
- Coordinates: 36°36′31″N 51°36′22″E
- Country: Iran
- Province: Mazandaran
- County: Nowshahr
- District: Central
- Rural District: Kheyrud Kenar

Population (2016)
  - Total: 1,319
- Time zone: UTC+3:30 (IRST)

Mazga (Persian: مزگا) (Note: Also romanized as Mazgā) is a village in Kheyrud Kenar Rural District of the Central District in Nowshahr County, Mazandaran province, Iran.

== Demographics ==
=== Population ===
At the time of the 2006 National Census, the village's population was 1,108 in 327 households. The following census in 2011 counted 1,301 people in 387 households. The 2016 census measured the population of the village as 1,319 people in 406 households.
