= Aliabad-e Mir =

Village in Mazandaran province, Iran

Aliabad-e Mir Persian: علی آباد میر
- Village
- Location within Iran
- Coordinates: 36°37′53″N 51°31′22″E
- Country: Iran
- Province: Mazandaran
- County: Nowshahr
- District: Central
- Rural District: Kheyrud Kenar

Population (2016)
  - Total: 3,034
- Time zone: UTC+3:30 (IRST)

Aliabad-e Mir (Persian: علی آباد میر) (Note: Also romanized as ‘Alīābād-e Mīr; also known as Ali Abad Kheyrood Kenar, ‘Alīābād, and ‘Aliābād-i-Buzurg) is a village in Kheyrud Kenar Rural District of the Central District in Nowshahr County, Mazandaran province, Iran.

== Demographics ==
=== Population ===
At the time of the 2006 National Census, the village's population was 3,065 in 816 households. The following census in 2011 counted 3,321 people in 972 households. The 2016 census measured the population of the village as 3,034 people in 1,116 households.
