= Taj ol Din Kola =

Taj ol Din Kola تاج الدين كلا
- Village
- Location within Iran
- Coordinates: 36°33′46″N 51°48′41″E
- Country: Iran
- Province: Mazandaran
- County: Nowshahr
- Bakhsh: Central
- Rural District: Baladeh Kojur

Population (2016)
  - Total: 308
- Time zone: UTC+3:30 (IRST)

Taj ol Din Kola (Persian: تاج الدين كلا, also Romanized as Tāj ol Dīn Kolā, Tāj ed Dīn Kolā, and Tāj od Dīn Kolā) is a village in Baladeh Kojur Rural District, in the Central District of Nowshahr County, Mazandaran Province, Iran.

At the time of the 2006 National Census, the village's population was 281 in 71 households. The following census in 2011 counted 282 people in 85 households. The 2016 census measured the population of the village as 308 people in 97 households.
