= Dozdak, Nowshahr =

Dezdak دزدک
- Village
- Location within Iran
- Coordinates: 36°35′21″N 51°40′26″E
- Country: Iran
- Province: Mazandaran
- County: Nowshahr
- Bakhsh: Central
- Rural District: Baladeh Kojur

Population (2016)
  - Total: 895
- Time zone: UTC+3:30 (IRST)

Dezdak (Persian: دزدک) is a village in Baladeh Kojur Rural District, in the Central District of Nowshahr County, Mazandaran Province, Iran.

At the time of the 2006 National Census, the village's population was 765 in 195 households. The following census in 2011 counted 794 people in 222 households. The 2016 census measured the population of the village as 895 people in 293 households.
