= Kheyrud Kenar =

Village in Mazandaran province, Iran

Kheyrud Kenar Persian: خيرودكنار
- Village
- Location within Iran
- Coordinates: 36°36′47″N 51°33′42″E
- Country: Iran
- Province: Mazandaran
- County: Nowshahr
- District: Central
- Rural District: Kheyrud Kenar

Population (2016)
  - Total: 1,996
- Time zone: UTC+3:30 (IRST)

Kheyrud Kenar (Persian: خيرودكنار) (Note: Also romanized as Kheyrūd Kenār; also known as Kheyr Rūd Kenār) is a village in Kheyrud Kenar Rural District of the Central District in Nowshahr County, Mazandaran province, Iran.

== Demographics ==
=== Population ===
At the time of the 2006 National Census, the village's population was 1,856 in 504 households. The following census in 2011 counted 1,655 people in 513 households. The 2016 census measured the population of the village as 1,996 people in 643 households.
