= Shab Khoskaj =

Shab Khoskaj شب خسكاج
- Village
- Location within Iran
- Coordinates: 36°37′28″N 51°32′56″E
- Country: Iran
- Province: Mazandaran
- County: Nowshahr
- Bakhsh: Central
- Rural District: Kheyrud Kenar

Population (2016)
  - Total: 614
- Time zone: UTC+3:30 (IRST)

Shab Khoskaj (Persian: شب خسكاج, also Romanized as Shab Khoskāj) is a village in Kheyrud Kenar Rural District, in the Central District of Nowshahr County, Mazandaran Province, Iran.

At the time of the 2006 National Census, the village's population was 571 in 156 households. The following census in 2011 counted 565 people in 173 households. The 2016 census measured the population of the village as 614 people in 203 households.
