= Darzi Kola, Nowshahr =

Darzi Kola درزي كلا
- Village
- Location within Iran
- Coordinates: 36°37′41″N 51°32′10″E
- Country: Iran
- Province: Mazandaran
- County: Nowshahr
- Bakhsh: Central
- Rural District: Kheyrud Kenar

Population (2016)
  - Total: 891
- Time zone: UTC+3:30 (IRST)

Darzi Kola (Persian: درزي كلا, also Romanized as Darzī Kolā; also known as Asb Som-e Deh) is a village in Kheyrud Kenar Rural District, in the Central District of Nowshahr County, Mazandaran Province, Iran.

At the time of the 2006 National Census, the village's population was 773 in 208 households. The following census in 2011 counted 824 people in 246 households. The 2016 census measured the population of the village as 891 people in 294 households.
