= Bandpey =

Village in Mazandaran province, Iran

Bandpey Persian: بندپي
- Village
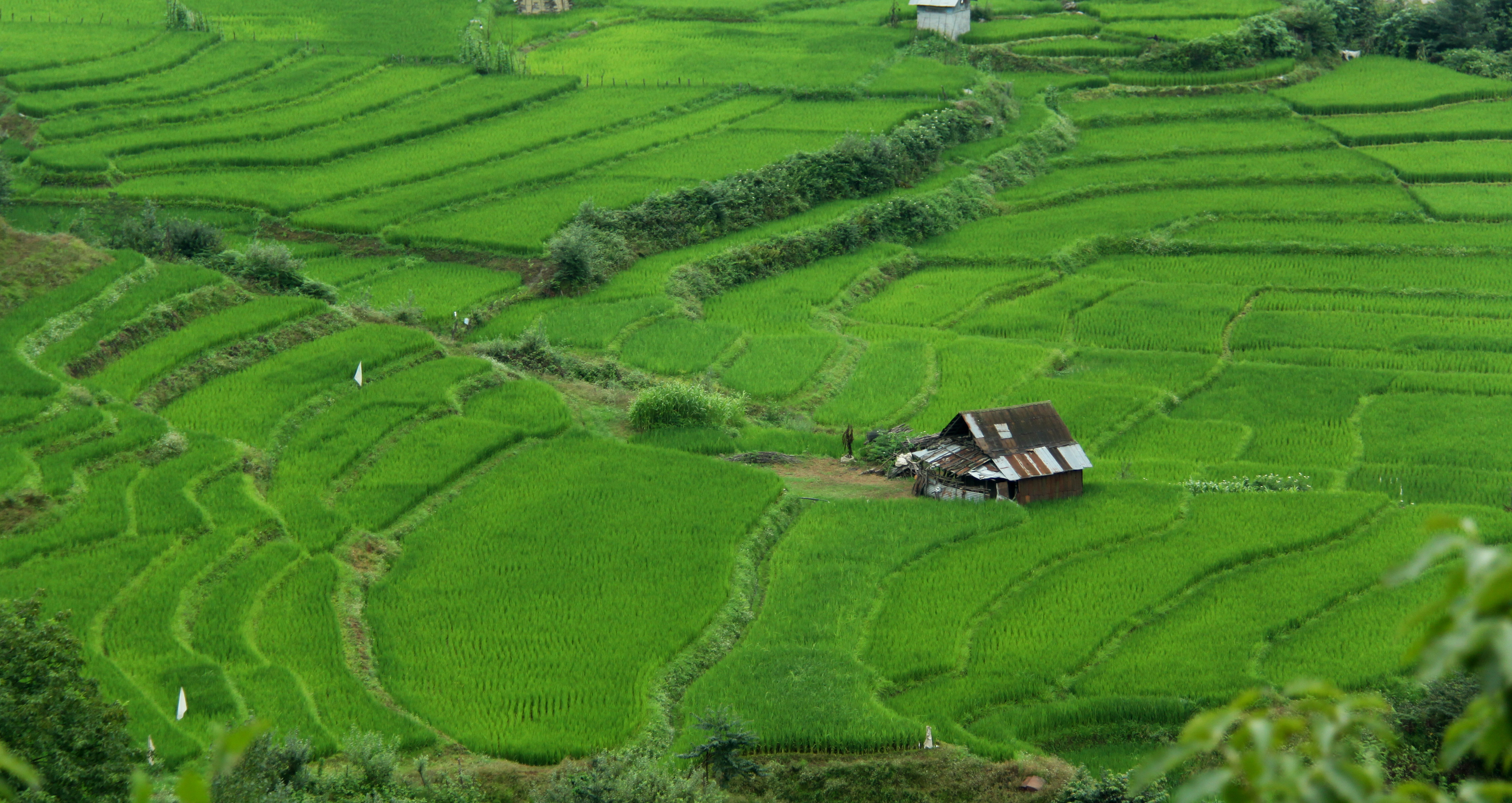
- Landscape in the village of Bandpey

- Location within Iran
- Coordinates: 36°36′32″N 51°35′06″E
- Country: Iran
- Province: Mazandaran
- County: Nowshahr
- District: Central
- Rural District: Kheyrud Kenar

Population (2016)
  - Total: 1,436
- Time zone: UTC+3:30 (IRST)

Bandpey (Persian: بندپي) (Note: Also romanized as Band Pī) is a village in Kheyrud Kenar Rural District of the Central District in Nowshahr County, Mazandaran province, Iran.

== Demographics ==
=== Population ===
At the time of the 2006 National Census, the village's population was 1,447 in 376 households. The following census in 2011 counted 1,428 people in 420 households. The 2016 census measured the population of the village as 1,436 people in 450 households.
