= Andarvar =

Village in Mazandaran province, Iran

Andarvar Persian: اندرور
- Village
- Location within Iran
- Coordinates: 36°34′56″N 51°44′18″E
- Country: Iran
- Province: Mazandaran
- County: Nowshahr
- District: Central
- Rural District: Baladeh Kojur

Population (2016)
  - Total: 1,611
- Time zone: UTC+3:30 (IRST)

Andarvar (Persian: اندرور) (Note: Also romanized as Āndarvar; also known as Andarood and Andarūd) is a village in, and the capital of, Baladeh Kojur Rural District in the Central District of Nowshahr County, Mazandaran province, Iran.

== Demographics ==
=== Population ===
At the time of the 2006 National Census, the village's population was 1,641 in 419 households. The following census in 2011 counted 1,776 people in 511 households. The 2016 census measured the population of the village as 1,611 people in 512 households.
