= Molkar =

Village in Mazandaran province, Iran

Molkar Persian: ملكار
- Village
- Location within Iran
- Coordinates: 36°35′13″N 51°42′26″E
- Country: Iran
- Province: Mazandaran
- County: Nowshahr
- District: Central
- Rural District: Baladeh Kojur

Population (2016)
  - Total: 1,223
- Time zone: UTC+3:30 (IRST)

Molkar (Persian: ملكار) (Note: Also romanized as Molkār) is a village in Baladeh Kojur Rural District of the Central District in Nowshahr County, Mazandaran province, Iran.

== Demographics ==
=== Population ===
At the time of the 2006 National Census, the village's population was 950 in 238 households. The following census in 2011 counted 1,063 people in 315 households. The 2016 census measured the population of the village as 1,223 people in 385 households.
