= Howz Koti =

Howz Koti حوض کتی
- Village
- Location within Iran
- Coordinates: 36°35′17″N 51°41′12″E
- Country: Iran
- Province: Mazandaran
- County: Nowshahr
- Bakhsh: Central
- Rural District: Baladeh Kojur

Population (2016)
  - Total: 856
- Time zone: UTC+3:30 (IRST)

Howz Koti (Persian: حوض کتی, also Romanized as Ḩowẕ Kotī) is a village in Baladeh Kojur Rural District, in the Central District of Nowshahr County, Mazandaran Province, Iran.

At the time of the 2006 National Census, the village's population was 751 in 195 households. The following census in 2011 counted 847 people in 249 households. The 2016 census measured the population of the village as 856 people in 270 households.
