= Abandanak =

Abandanak آبندانک
- Village
- Location within Iran
- Coordinates: 36°37′09″N 51°31′32″E
- Country: Iran
- Province: Mazandaran
- County: Nowshahr
- Bakhsh: Central
- Rural District: Kheyrud Kenar

Population (2016)
  - Total: 996
- Time zone: UTC+3:30 (IRST)

Abandanak (Persian: آبندانک, also Romanized as Ābandānak; also known as Ābandāk) is a village in Kheyrud Kenar Rural District, in the Central District of Nowshahr County, Mazandaran Province, Iran.

At the time of the 2006 National Census, the village's population was 874 in 227 households. The following census in 2011 counted 901 people in 278 households. The 2016 census measured the population of the village as 996 people in 325 households.
