= Sham Jaran =

Sham Jaran شمع جاران
- Village
- Location within Iran
- Coordinates: 36°37′59″N 51°32′14″E
- Country: Iran
- Province: Mazandaran
- County: Nowshahr
- Bakhsh: Central
- Rural District: Kheyrud Kenar

Population (2016)
  - Total: 710
- Time zone: UTC+3:30 (IRST)

Sham Jaran (Persian: شمع جاران, also Romanized as Sham‘ Jārān) is a village in Kheyrud Kenar Rural District, in the Central District of Nowshahr County, Mazandaran Province, Iran.

At the time of the 2006 National Census, the village's population was 668 in 181 households. The following census in 2011 counted 654 people in 191 households. The 2016 census measured the population of the village as 710 people in 231 households.
