= NSH =

NSH may refer to:

== Hospitals ==
- North Shore Hospital, Auckland, New Zealand
- Royal North Shore Hospital, Sydney, Australia

== Sport ==
- Nashville Predators, a hockey team
- Nashville Kats, an arena football team

== Transportation ==
- North Sheen railway station, London, England
- North Shore railway station, Victoria, Australia
- Noshahr Airport, Iran (IATA: NSH)

== Other uses ==
- Nashua Corporation (1849–2000; NYSE: NSH)
- National Show Horse, a breed of horse
- Nova Scotia Highlanders, a Canadian reserve regiment
- .nsh, Nullsoft Scriptable Install System
