= Vazivar =

Vazivar وازيوار
- Village
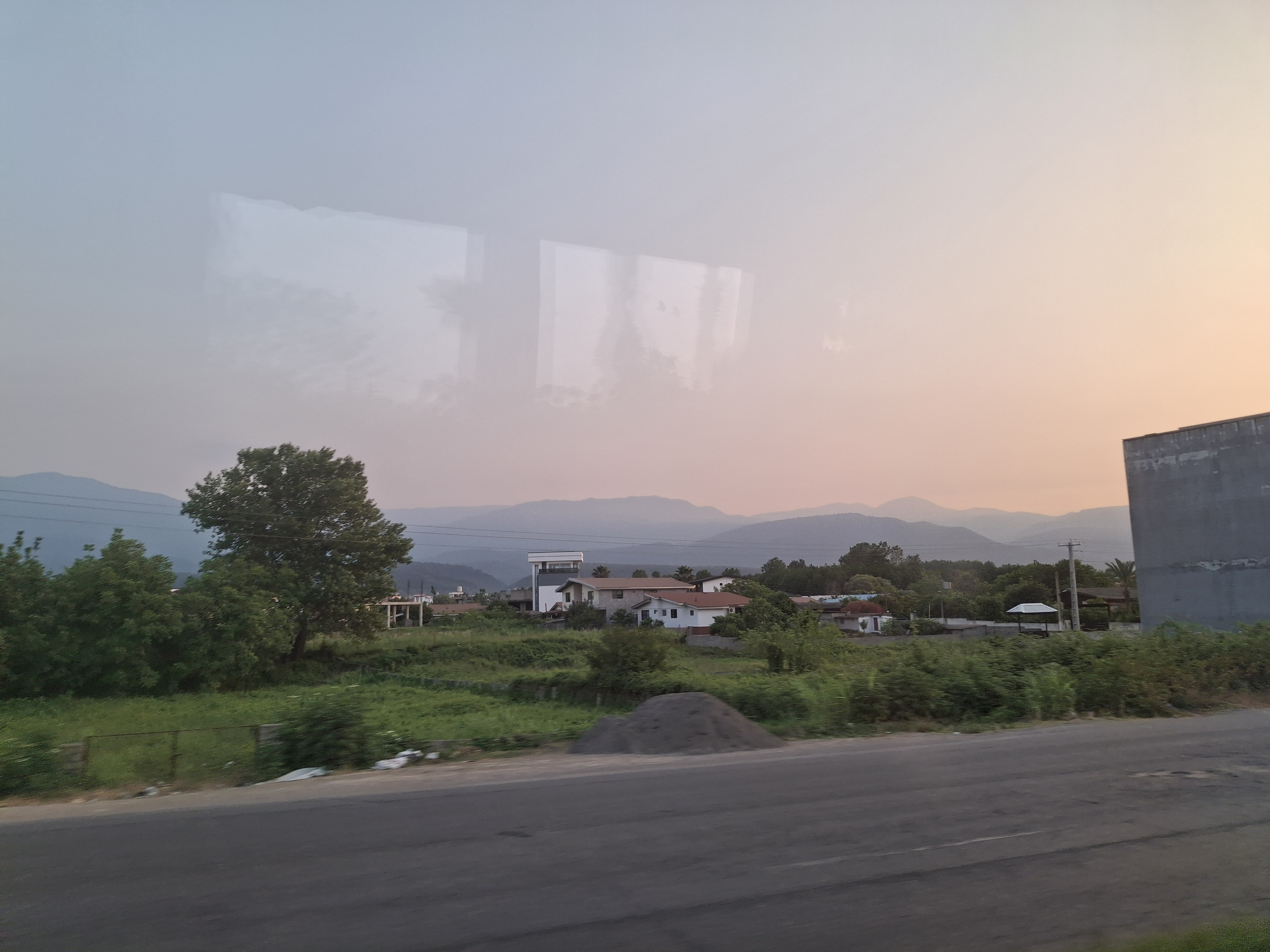

- Location within Iran
- Coordinates: 36°34′02″N 51°54′24″E
- Country: Iran
- Province: Mazandaran
- County: Nowshahr
- Bakhsh: Central
- Rural District: Kalej

Population (2016)
  - Total: 385
- Time zone: UTC+3:30 (IRST)

Vazivar (Persian: وازيوار, also Romanized as Vāzīvār and Vāzīvar) is a village in Kalej Rural District, in the Central District of Nowshahr County, Mazandaran Province, Iran.

At the time of the 2006 National Census, the village's population was 476 in 129 households. The following census in 2011 counted 391 people in 115 households. The 2016 census measured the population of the village as 385 people in 128 households.
