= Baziar Kola =

Baziar Kola بازياركلا
- Village
- Location within Iran
- Coordinates: 36°32′46″N 51°55′08″E
- Country: Iran
- Province: Mazandaran
- County: Nowshahr
- Bakhsh: Central
- Rural District: Kalej

Population (2016)
  - Total: 678
- Time zone: UTC+3:30 (IRST)

Baziar Kola (Persian: بازياركلا, also Romanized as Bāzīār Kolā) is a village in Kalej Rural District, in the Central District of Nowshahr County, Mazandaran Province, Iran.

At the time of the 2006 National Census, the village's population was 564 in 137 households. The following census in 2011 counted 648 people in 189 households. The 2016 census measured the population of the village as 678 people in 210 households.
