= Now Deh, Nowshahr =

Now Deh نوده
- Village
- Location within Iran
- Coordinates: 36°33′11″N 51°55′21″E
- Country: Iran
- Province: Mazandaran
- County: Nowshahr
- Bakhsh: Central
- Rural District: Kalej

Population (2016)
  - Total: 245
- Time zone: UTC+3:30 (IRST)

Now Deh (Persian: نوده) is a village in Kalej Rural District, in the Central District of Nowshahr County, Mazandaran Province, Iran.

At the time of the 2006 National Census, the village's population was 268 in 66 households. The following census in 2011 counted 226 people in 66 households. The 2016 census measured the population of the village as 245 people in 74 households.
