= Narenjbon, Mazandaran =

Village in Mazandaran province, Iran

Narenjbon Persian: نارنج بن
- Village
- Location within Iran
- Coordinates: 36°32′48″N 51°52′12″E
- Country: Iran
- Province: Mazandaran
- County: Nowshahr
- District: Central
- Rural District: Kalej

Population (2016)
  - Total: 1,108
- Time zone: UTC+3:30 (IRST)

Narenjbon (Persian: نارنج بن) (Note: Also romanized as Nārenjbon; also known as Nārenjak Bon) is a village in, and the capital of, Kalej Rural District in the Central District of Nowshahr County, Mazandaran province, Iran.

== Demographics ==
=== Population ===
At the time of the 2006 National Census, the village's population was 1,061 in 307 households. The following census in 2011 counted 1,135 people in 357 households. The 2016 census measured the population of the village as 1,108 people in 372 households.
