= Chilak-e Olya =

Chilak-e Olya چیلک عليا
- Village
- Location within Iran
- Coordinates: 36°35′27″N 51°38′21″E
- Country: Iran
- Province: Mazandaran
- County: Nowshahr
- Bakhsh: Central
- Rural District: Baladeh Kojur

Population (2016)
  - Total: 452
- Time zone: UTC+3:30 (IRST)

Chilak-e Olya (Persian: چیلک عليا, also Romanized as Chīlak-e ‘Olyā; also known as Chīlak-e Bālā) is a village in Baladeh Kojur Rural District, in the Central District of Nowshahr County, Mazandaran Province, Iran.

At the time of the 2006 National Census, the village's population was 369 in 92 households. The following census in 2011 counted 328 people in 91 households. The 2016 census measured the population of the village as 452 people in 147 households.
