= Kordi Kola =

Kordi Kola کردی کلا
- Village
- Location within Iran
- Coordinates: 36°38′16″N 51°28′46″E
- Country: Iran
- Province: Mazandaran
- County: Nowshahr
- Bakhsh: Central
- Rural District: Kheyrud Kenar

Population (2016)
  - Total: 804
- Time zone: UTC+3:30 (IRST)

Kordi Kola (Persian: کردی کلا, also Romanized as Kordī Kolā) is a village in Kheyrud Kenar Rural District, in the Central District of Nowshahr County, Mazandaran Province, Iran.

At the time of the 2006 National Census, the village's population was 432 in 114 households. The following census in 2011 counted 732 people in 214 households. The 2016 census measured the population of the village as 804 people in 255 households.
