= Musaabad, Mazandaran =

Village in Mazandaran province, Iran

Musaabad Persian: موسي اباد
- Village
- Location within Iran
- Coordinates: 36°37′51″N 51°30′59″E
- Country: Iran
- Province: Mazandaran
- County: Nowshahr
- District: Central
- Rural District: Kheyrud Kenar

Population (2016)
  - Total: 1,817
- Time zone: UTC+3:30 (IRST)

Musaabad (Persian: موسي اباد) (Note: Also romanized as Mūsáābād and Mūsī Ābād) is a village in, and the capital of, Kheyrud Kenar Rural District in the Central District of Nowshahr County, Mazandaran province, Iran.

== Demographics ==
=== Population ===
At the time of the 2006 National Census, the village's population was 1,705 in 458 households. The following census in 2011 counted 1,906 people in 570 households. The 2016 census measured the population of the village as 1,817 people in 602 households.
