= Benjkul-e Sofla =

Benjkul-e Sofla بنجكول سفلی
- Village
- Location within Iran
- Coordinates: 36°34′03″N 51°55′16″E
- Country: Iran
- Province: Mazandaran
- County: Nowshahr
- Bakhsh: Central
- Rural District: Kalej

Population (2016)
  - Total: 454
- Time zone: UTC+3:30 (IRST)

Benjkul-e Sofla (Persian: بنجكول سفلی, also Romanized as Benjkūl-e Soflá; also known as Benchkūl and Benchkūl-e Pā’īn) is a village in Kalej Rural District, in the Central District of Nowshahr County, Mazandaran Province, Iran.

At the time of the 2006 National Census, the village's population was 379 in 104 households. The following census in 2011 counted 324 people in 90 households. The 2016 census measured the population of the village as 454 people in 144 households.
