= Kohneh Sara, Mazandaran =

Village in Mazandaran province, Iran

Kohneh Sara Persian: كهنه سرا
- Village
- Location within Iran
- Coordinates: 36°35′22″N 51°39′57″E
- Country: Iran
- Province: Mazandaran
- County: Nowshahr
- District: Central
- Rural District: Baladeh Kojur

Population (2016)
  - Total: 1,013
- Time zone: UTC+3:30 (IRST)

Kohneh Sara (Persian: كهنه سرا) (Note: Also romanized as Kohneh Sarā) is a village in Baladeh Kojur Rural District of the Central District in Nowshahr County, Mazandaran province, Iran.

== Demographics ==
=== Population ===
At the time of the 2006 National Census, the village's population was 912 in 222 households. The following census in 2011 counted 931 people in 261 households. The 2016 census measured the population of the village as 1,013 people in 317 households.
