= Hamzeh Deh-e Sofla =

Hamzeh Deh-e Sofla حمزه ده سفلی
- Village
- Location within Iran
- Coordinates: 36°34′36″N 51°42′14″E
- Country: Iran
- Province: Mazandaran
- County: Nowshahr
- Bakhsh: Central
- Rural District: Baladeh Kojur

Population (2016)
  - Total: 537
- Time zone: UTC+3:30 (IRST)

Hamzeh Deh-e Sofla (Persian: حمزه ده سفلی, also Romanized as Ḩamzeh Deh-e Soflá; also known as Ḩamzeh Deh-e Pā’īn) is a village in Baladeh Kojur Rural District, in the Central District of Nowshahr County, Mazandaran Province, Iran.

At the time of the 2006 National Census, the village's population was 525 in 125 households. The following census in 2011 counted 600 people in 162 households. The 2016 census measured the population of the village as 537 people in 169 households.
