= Kalej Rural District =

Rural district in Mazandaran province, Iran

Kalej Rural District Persian: دهستان كالج
- Rural District
- Location within Iran
- Coordinates: 36°31′N 51°53′E
- Country: Iran
- Province: Mazandaran
- County: Nowshahr
- District: Central
- Established: 1987
- Capital: Narenjbon

Population (2016)
  - Total: 13,727
- Time zone: UTC+3:30 (IRST)

Kalej Rural District (Persian: دهستان كالج) is in the Central District of Nowshahr County, Mazandaran province, Iran. Its capital is the village of Narenjbon.

== Demographics ==
=== Population ===
At the time of the 2006 National Census, the rural district's population was 12,427 in 3,362 households. There were 12,786 inhabitants in 3,818 households at the following census of 2011. The 2016 census measured the population of the rural district as 13,727 in 4,435 households. The most populous of its 17 villages was Vanush, with 2,669 people.

=== Other villages in the rural district ===
- Alvi Kola
- Baziar Kola
- Benjkul-e Sofla
- Ezzat
- Farrash Kola-ye Olya
- Farrash Kola-ye Sofla
- Hasanabad
- Khezr-e Tireh
- Manuchehr Kola
- Mianak
- Now Deh
- Pasha Kola
- Siah Rud
- Vazivar
