= Mianak, Nowshahr =

Village in Mazandaran province, Iran

Mianak Persian: ميانك
- Village
- Location within Iran
- Coordinates: 36°33′22″N 51°53′39″E
- Country: Iran
- Province: Mazandaran
- County: Nowshahr
- District: Central
- Rural District: Kalej

Population (2016)
  - Total: 1,129
- Time zone: UTC+3:30 (IRST)

Mianak (Persian: ميانك) (Note: Also romanized as Mīānak) is a village in Kalej Rural District of the Central District in Nowshahr County, Mazandaran province, Iran.

== Demographics ==
=== Population ===
At the time of the 2006 National Census, the village's population was 985 in 270 households. The following census in 2011 counted 1,110 people in 332 households. The 2016 census measured the population of the village as 1,129 people in 357 households.
