= Sangtu (village) =

Sangtu سنگتو
- Village
- Location within Iran
- Coordinates: 36°37′00″N 51°33′00″E
- Country: Iran
- Province: Mazandaran
- County: Nowshahr
- Bakhsh: Central
- Rural District: Kheyrud Kenar

Population (2016)
  - Total: 452
- Time zone: UTC+3:30 (IRST)

Sangtu (Persian: سنگتو, also Romanized as Sangtū) is a village in Kheyrud Kenar Rural District, in the Central District of Nowshahr County, Mazandaran Province, Iran.

At the time of the 2006 National Census, the village's population was 268 in 69households. The following census in 2011 counted 253 people in 77 households. The 2016 census measured the population of the village as 452 people in 150 households.
