= Kheyrud Kenar Rural District =

Rural district in Mazandaran province, Iran

Kheyrud Kenar Rural District Persian: دهستان خيرود كنار
- Rural District
- Location within Iran
- Coordinates: 36°35′N 51°32′E
- Country: Iran
- Province: Mazandaran
- County: Nowshahr
- District: Central
- Established: 1987
- Capital: Musaabad

Population (2016)
  - Total: 36,364
- Time zone: UTC+3:30 (IRST)

Kheyrud Kenar Rural District (Persian: دهستان خيرود كنار) is in the Central District of Nowshahr County, Mazandaran province, Iran. Its capital is the village of Musaabad.

== Demographics ==
=== Population ===
At the time of the 2006 National Census, the rural district's population was 32,041 in 8,567 households. There were 35,613 inhabitants in 10,743 households at the following census of 2011. The 2016 census measured the population of the rural district as 36,364 in 11,851 households. The most populous of its 24 villages was Tazehabad, with 5,029 people.

=== Other villages in the rural district ===
- Abandanak
- Aliabad-e Mir
- Amir Rud
- Bandpey
- Darzi Kola
- Kheyrud Kenar
- Khir Sar
- Kordi Kola
- Koshk-e Sara
- Kurkursar-e Olya
- Latingan
- Margir Deh
- Mazga
- Najjar Deh
- Neyrang
- Sang-e Tajan
- Sangtu
- Seyyed Ali-ye Kiasoltan
- Shab Khoskaj
- Shahr-e Posht
- Sham Jaran
- Shariatabad
