= Baladeh Kojur Rural District =

Rural district in Mazandaran province, Iran

Baladeh Kojur Rural District Persian: دهستان بلده كجور
- Rural District
- Location within Iran
- Coordinates: 36°33′N 51°44′E
- Country: Iran
- Province: Mazandaran
- County: Nowshahr
- District: Central
- Established: 1987
- Capital: Andarvar

Population (2016)
  - Total: 18,521
- Time zone: UTC+3:30 (IRST)

Baladeh Kojur Rural District (Persian: دهستان بلده كجور) is in the Central District of Nowshahr County, Mazandaran province, Iran. Its capital is the village of Andarvar.

== Demographics ==
=== Population ===
At the time of the 2006 National Census, the rural district's population was 17,085 in 4,335 households. There were 17,199 inhabitants in 5,023 households at the following census of 2011. The 2016 census measured the population of the rural district as 18,521 in 5,858 households. The most populous of its 23 villages was Salah ol Din Kola, with 2,593 people.

=== Other villages in the rural district ===
- Aliabad-e Asgarkhan
- Chalandar
- Chilak-e Olya
- Chilak-e Sofla
- Dizer Kola
- Dozdak
- Hamzeh Deh-e Olya
- Hamzeh Deh-e Sofla
- Howz Koti
- Kohneh Sara
- Molkar
- Molla Kola
- Navy Camp, Mazandaran
- Pey Kola
- Sang Sara
- Taj ol Din Kola
- Toskatok
