= Sang Sara, Mazandaran =

Sang Sara سنگ سرا
- Village
- Location within Iran
- Coordinates: 36°34′19″N 51°43′37″E
- Country: Iran
- Province: Mazandaran
- County: Nowshahr
- Bakhsh: Central
- Rural District: Baladeh Kojur

Population (2016)
  - Total: 831
- Time zone: UTC+3:30 (IRST)

Sang Sara (Persian: سنگ سرا, also Romanized as Sang Sarā) is a village in Baladeh Kojur Rural District, in the Central District of Nowshahr County, Mazandaran Province, Iran.

At the time of the 2006 National Census, the village's population was 733 in 179 households. The following census in 2011 counted 801 people in 224 households. The 2016 census measured the population of the village as 831 people in 260 households.
