= Hamzeh Deh-e Olya =

Hamzeh Deh-e Olya حمزه ده عليا
- Village
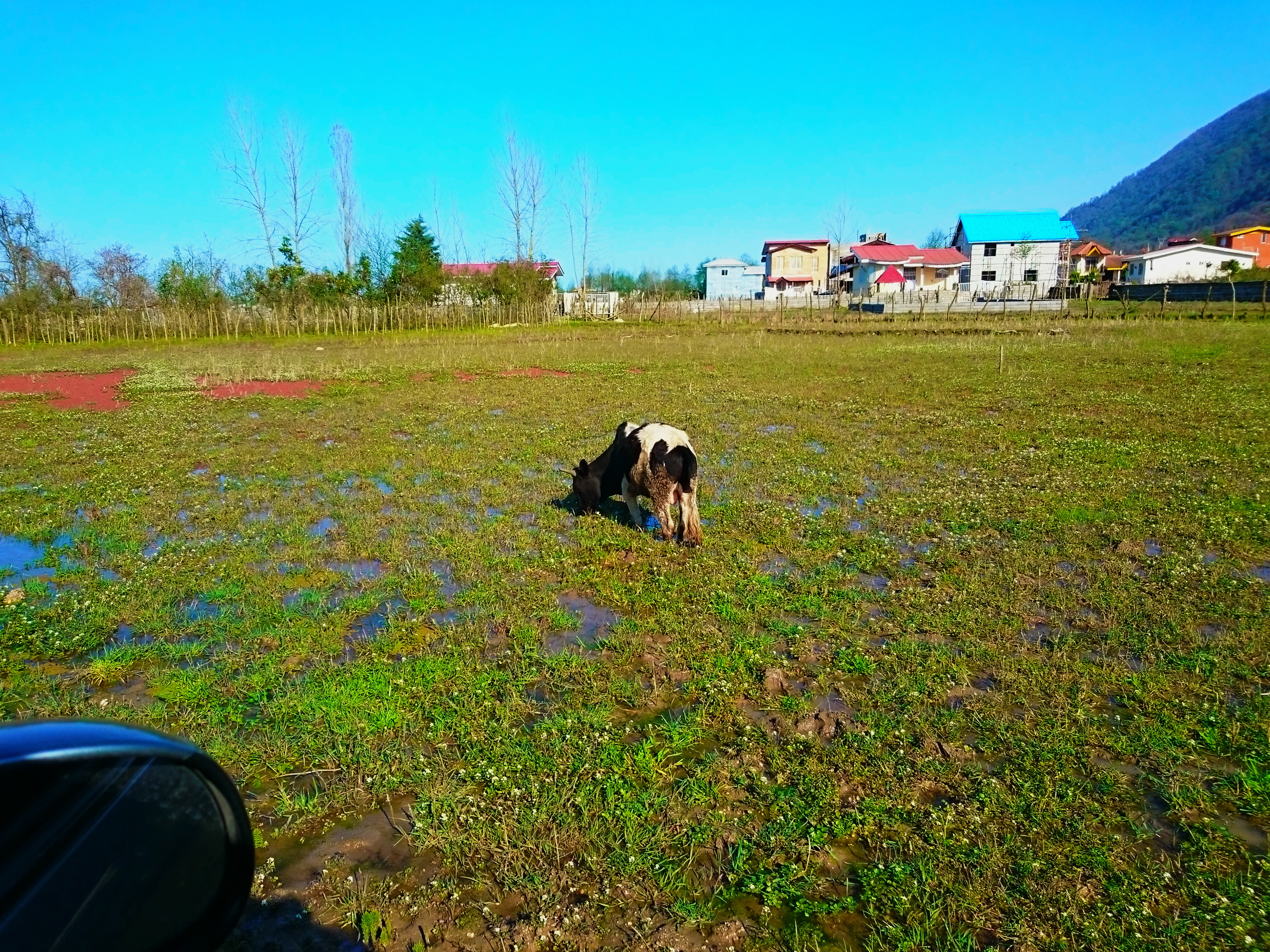

- Location within Iran
- Coordinates: 36°34′19″N 51°42′36″E
- Country: Iran
- Province: Mazandaran
- County: Nowshahr
- Bakhsh: Central
- Rural District: Baladeh Kojur

Population (2016)
  - Total: 707
- Time zone: UTC+3:30 (IRST)

Hamzeh Deh-e Olya (Persian: حمزه ده عليا, also Romanized as Ḩamzeh Deh-e ‘Olyā; also known as Ḩamzeh Deh-e Bālā) is a village in Baladeh Kojur Rural District, in the Central District of Nowshahr County, Mazandaran Province, Iran. At the 2016 census, its population was 707, in 206 families. Up from 593 people in 2006.
