= Farrash Kola-ye Olya =

Farrash Kola-ye Olya فراشكلا عليا
- Village
- Location within Iran
- Coordinates: 36°33′34″N 51°54′52″E
- Country: Iran
- Province: Mazandaran
- County: Nowshahr
- Bakhsh: Central
- Rural District: Kalej

Population (2016)
  - Total: 445
- Time zone: UTC+3:30 (IRST)

Farrash Kola-ye Olya (Persian: فراشكلا عليا, also Romanized as Farrāsh Kolā-ye ‘Olyā; also known as Farrāsh Kolā and Farrāsh Kolā-ye Bālā) is a village in Kalej Rural District, in the Central District of Nowshahr County, Mazandaran Province, Iran.

At the time of the 2006 National Census, the village's population was 407 in 111 households. The following census in 2011 counted 344 people in 100 households. The 2016 census measured the population of the village as 445 people in 131 households.
