= Farrash Kola-ye Sofla =

Farrash Kola-ye Sofla فراشکلا سفلی
- Village
- Location within Iran
- Coordinates: 36°34′01″N 51°54′45″E
- Country: Iran
- Province: Mazandaran
- County: Nowshahr
- Bakhsh: Central
- Rural District: Kalej

Population (2016)
  - Total: 241
- Time zone: UTC+3:30 (IRST)

Farrash Kola-ye Sofla (Persian: فراشکلا سفلی, also Romanized as Farrāsh Kolā-ye Soflá; also known as Farrāsh Kolā and Farrāsh Kolā-ye Pā’īn) is a village in Kalej Rural District, in the Central District of Nowshahr County, Mazandaran Province, Iran.

At the time of the 2006 National Census, the village's population was 264 in 73 households. The following census in 2011 counted 234 people in 68 households. The 2016 census measured the population of the village as 241 people in 79 households.
