= Noshahr Airport =

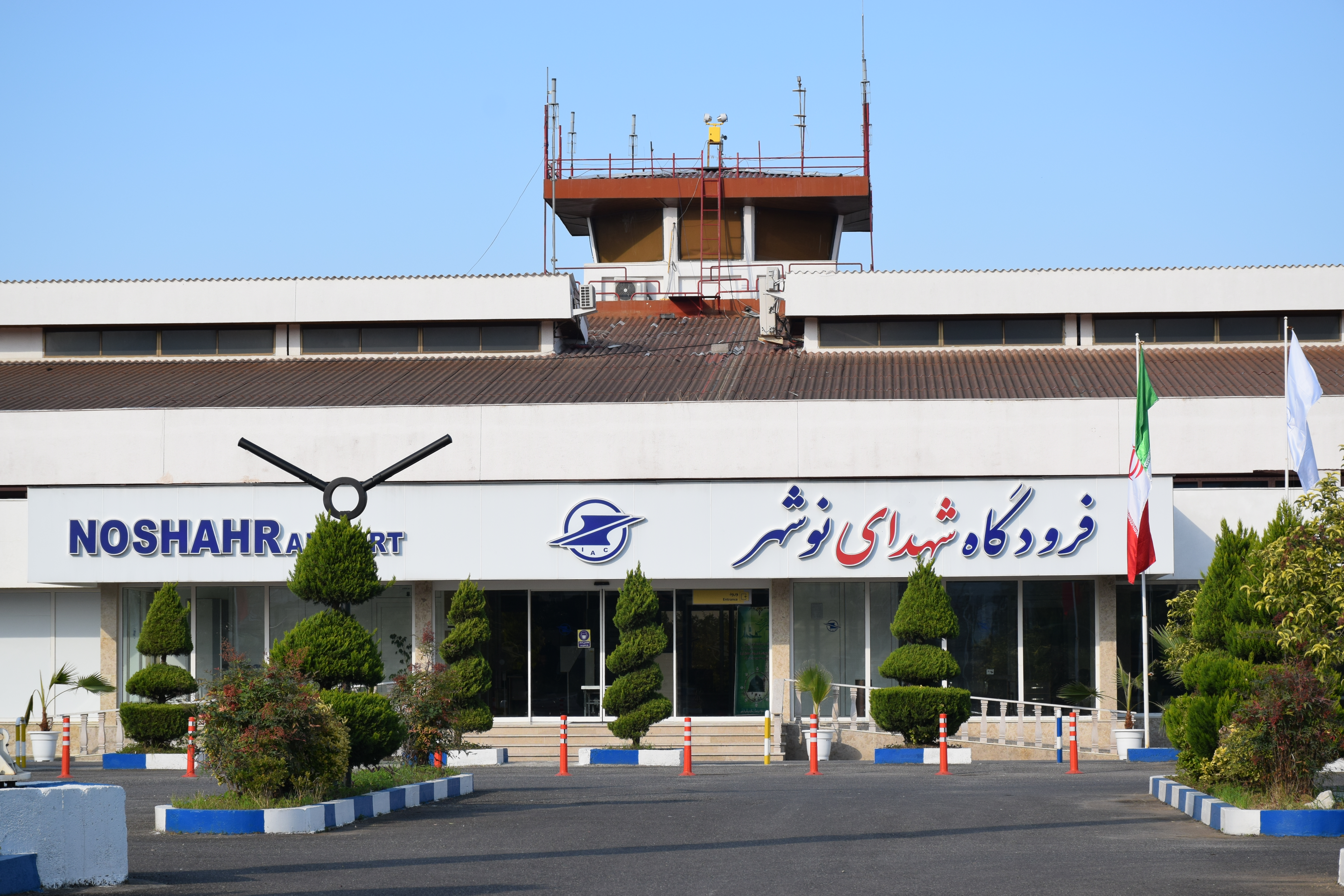
- IATA: NSH; ICAO: OINN

Summary
- Airport type: Public
- Owner: Government of Iran
- Operator: Iran Airports Company
- Serves: Nowshahr, Mazandaran
- Location: Nowshahr, Iran
- Elevation AMSL: −61 ft / −19 m
- Coordinates: 36°39′48″N 051°27′53″E
- Website: www.noshahr.airport.ir

Map
- Location of airport in Iran

Runways
Direction	Length		Surface
Direction	ft	m	Surface
10/28	6,182	2,150	Asphalt
- Source: World Aero Data

Noshahr Airport (IATA: NSH, ICAO: OINN) (Persian: فرودگاه نوشهر) is an airport in Noshahr, Mazandaran province, Iran.

Noshahhr was one of the touristic places and the most important port cities of northern Iran during the Pahlavi era. Noshahr was known as the summer capital of Iran, therefore the airport was used as a way to serve the former royal family of Iran or foreign officials visiting the Shah from Tehran. The airport was also aimed at serving the tourists visiting Noshahr and established special flights for employees of the National Iranian Oil Company to bring them from Ahvaz to Noshahr which was the closest airport to the National Iranian Oil Company hotels.

The airport's total area is about 85 hectares, with a 2,100m long runway capable of accepting medium-sized aircraft. In 2016, 470 airlifts were arranged at the airport and 33,886 kg were loaded and 335,377 passengers were flown through it. Nowadays Noshahr Airport operates flights to Mashhad and Shiraz.

== Airlines and destinations ==
Airlines	Destinations
Caspian Airlines	Mashhad
Qeshm Air	Shiraz
