= Sang Sara, Gilan =

Sang Sara سنگ سرا
- Village
- Location within Iran
- Coordinates: 37°02′26″N 50°00′27″E
- Country: Iran
- Province: Gilan
- County: Langarud
- Bakhsh: Otaqvar
- Rural District: Otaqvar

Population (2006)
  - Total: 39
- Time zone: UTC+3:30 (IRST)
  - Summer (DST): UTC+4:30 (IRDT)

Sang Sara (Persian: سنگ سرا, also Romanized as Sang Sarā; also known as Sangsar) is a village in Otaqvar Rural District, Otaqvar District, Langarud County, Gilan Province, Iran. At the 2006 census, its population was 39, in 8 families.
