= Nowshahr =

City in Mazandaran province, Iran

Nowshahr نوشهر
- City
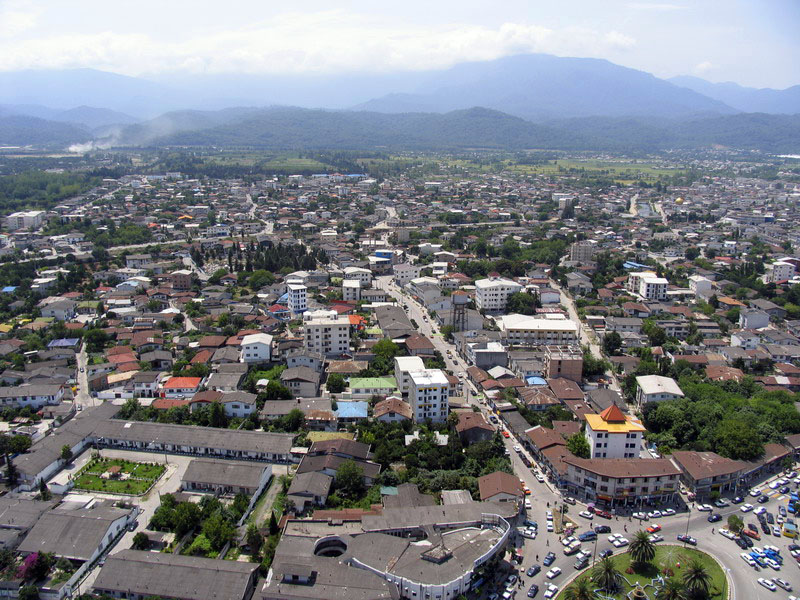
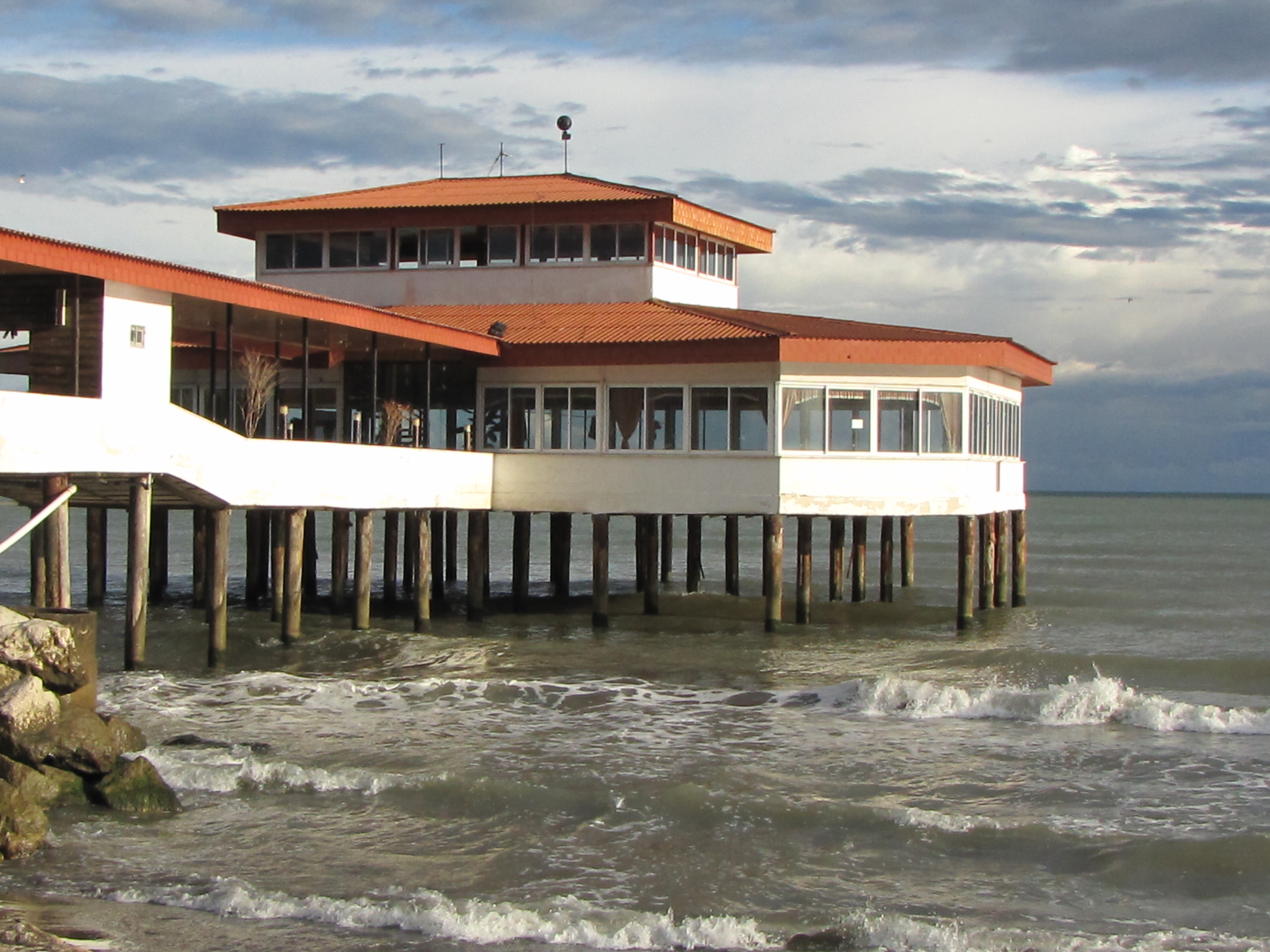
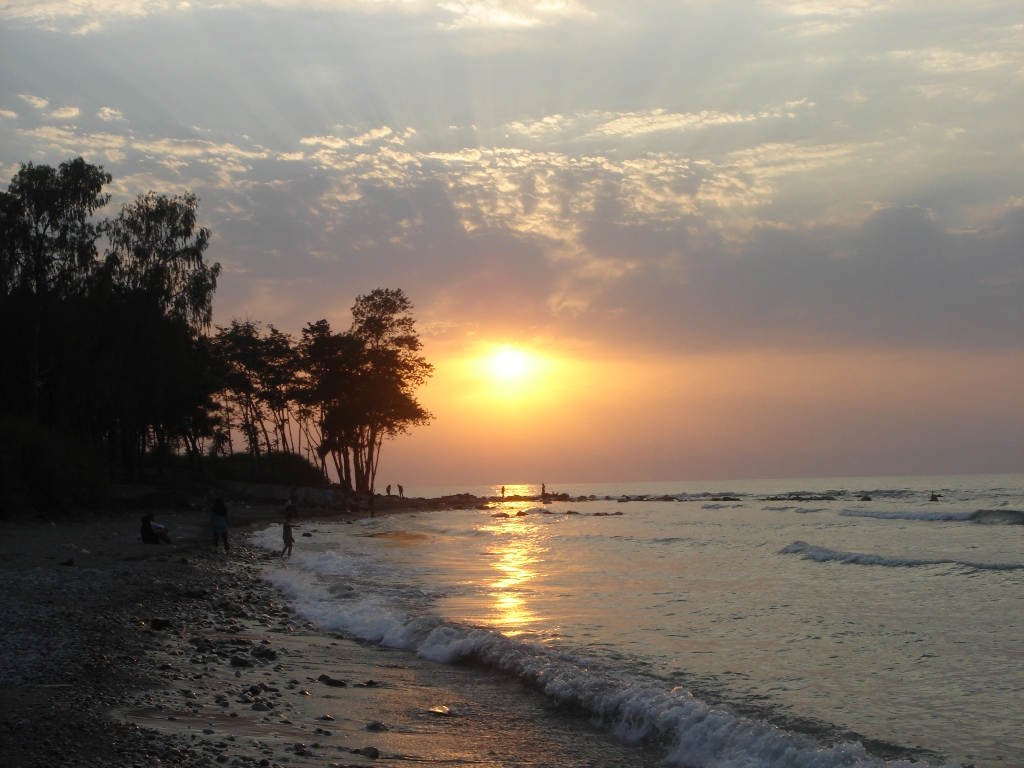
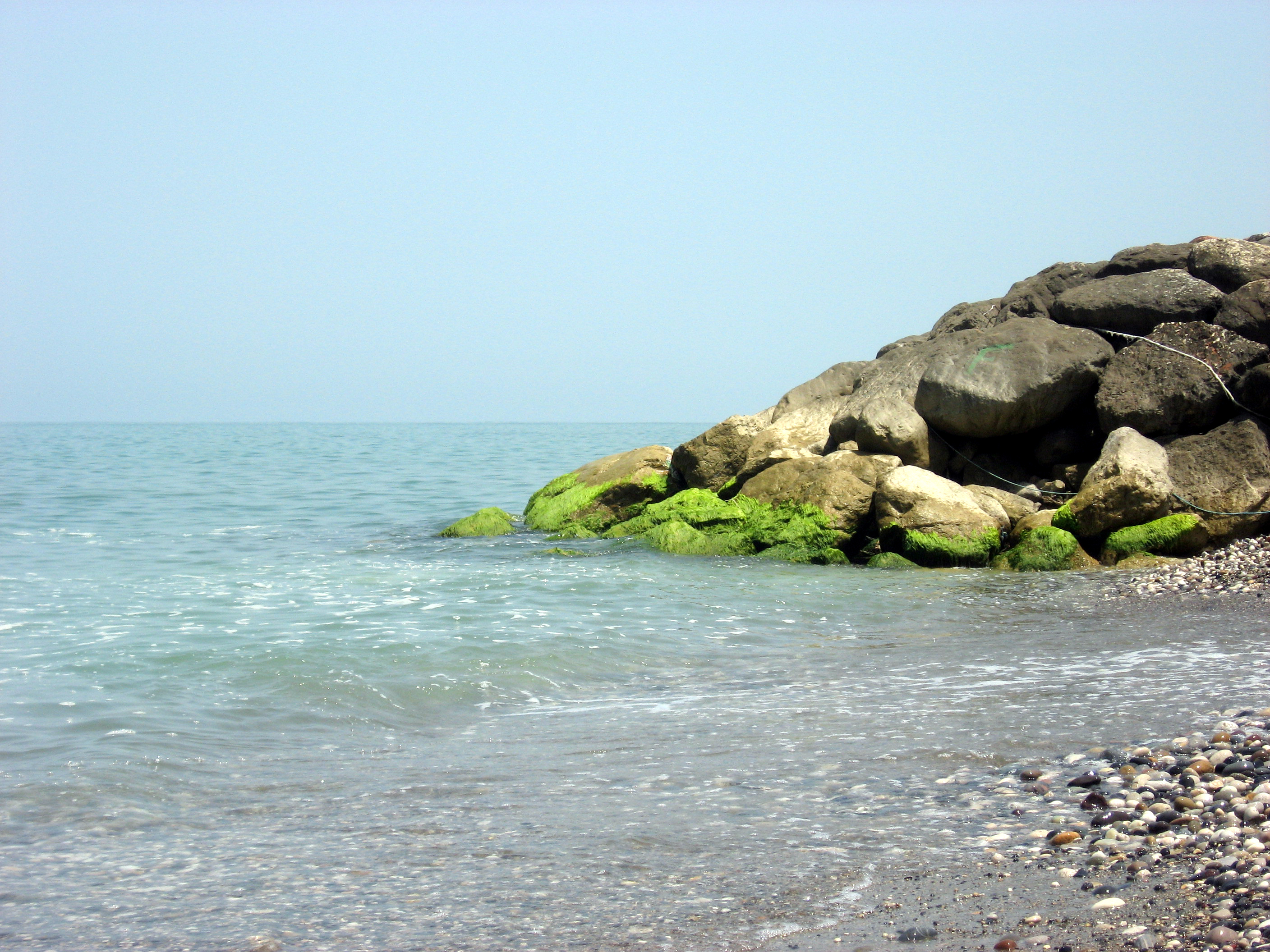
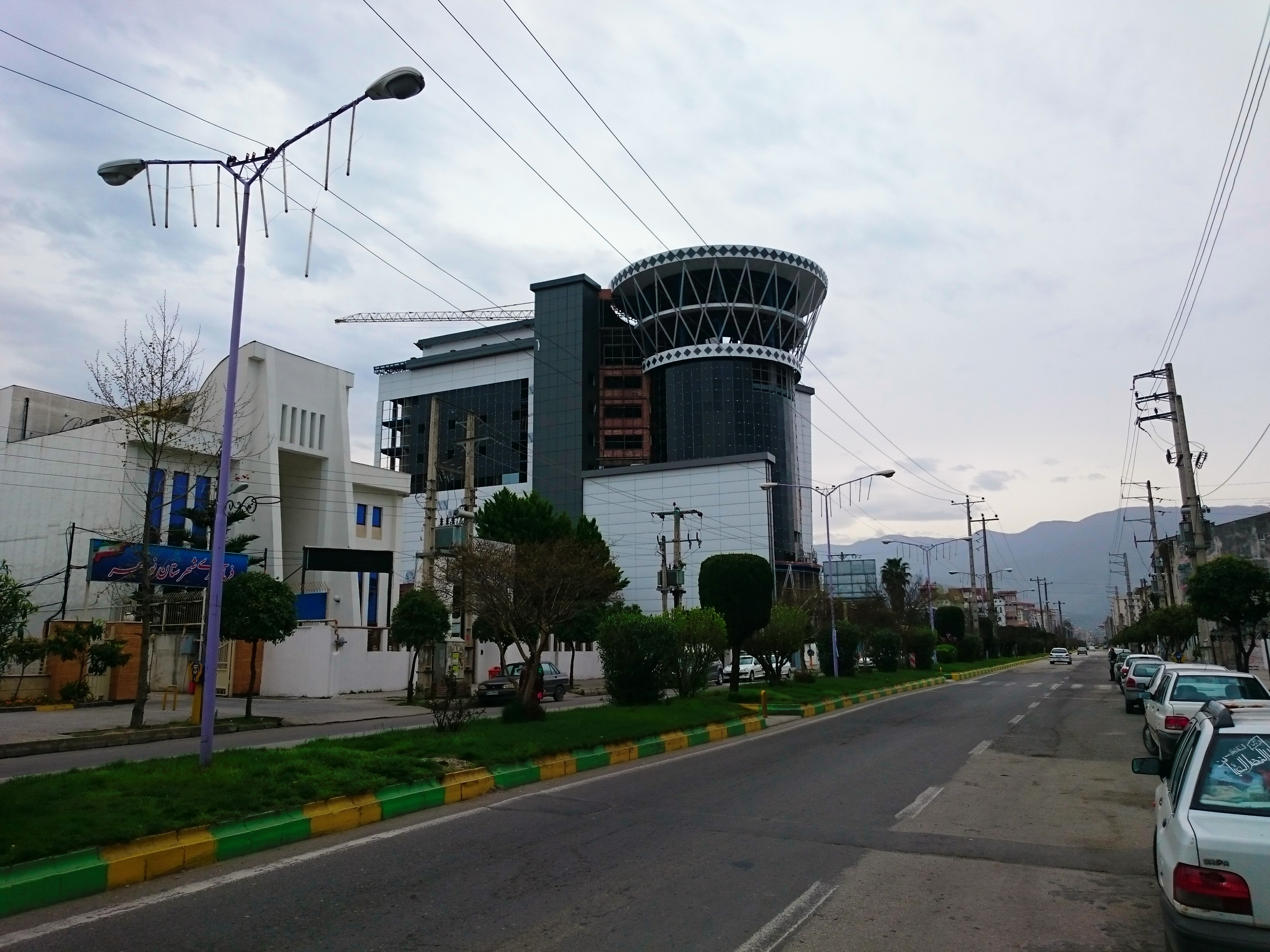

- Seal

- Location within Iran
- Coordinates: 36°38′51″N 51°29′35″E
- Country: Iran
- Province: Mazandaran
- County: Nowshahr
- District: Central

Government
  - Type: Mayor, City Council
  - Mayor: Jafar Ghomi Avili
  - Representative in Majles: Kamran Pouladi

Area
  - Total: 1,717.5 km^{2} (663.1 sq mi)

Population (2016)
  - Total: 49,403
  - Density: 28.764/km^{2} (74.500/sq mi)
- Time zone: UTC+3:30 (IRST)
- Postal code: 46516
- Area code: 011
- Website: noshahr.gov.ir

Nowshahr (Persian: نوشهر) (Note: Also romanized as Nau Shahr and Now Shahr; also known as Bandar-e Noshahr and Noshahr; formerly Dehno) is a city in the Central District of Nowshahr County, Mazandaran province, Iran, serving as capital of both the county and the district. It is a port city on the southern coast of the Caspian Sea.

== History ==
Ruyan is a region in the west of Mazandaran province. This land includes Kojur, Kalārestāq and Tonekabon. The city of Kojur was the center of the land of the Ruyans. Ruyan has always been part of Tabaristan, nowadays called Mazandaran province. Ruyan was also called Rostamdār, Ostandār and Rostamdele.

The city of Chalus and its associated towns and villages were part of the Nowshahr township prior to 1996, after which they formed the new township of by legislation from the national parliament.

== Demographics ==
=== Language and ethnicity ===
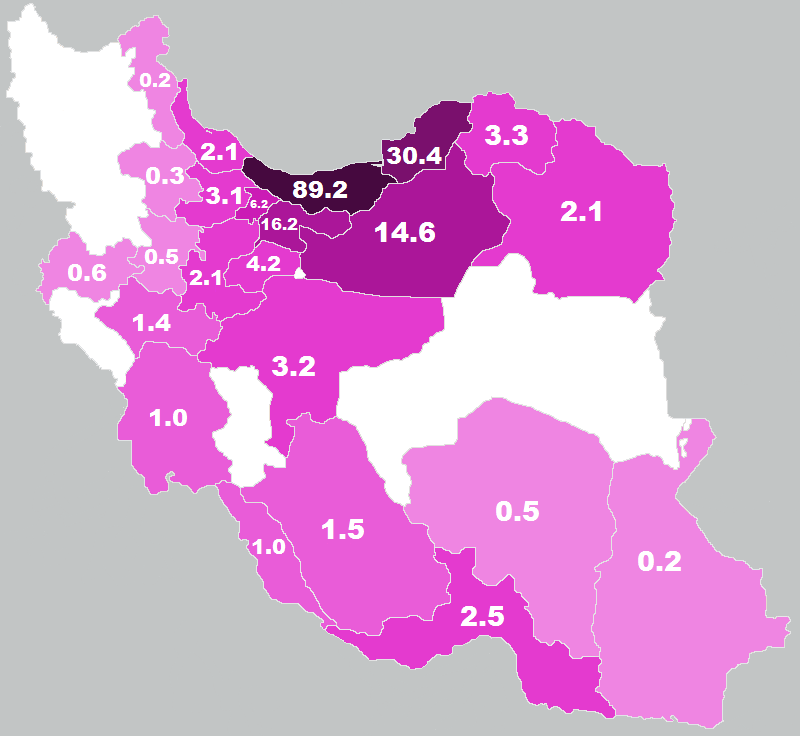
Mazandaranis in Iran (2010 poll)

The largest ethnic group in Nowshahr is the Mazandarani people and they speak the Kojuri dialect of the language. They are also fluent in Persian, the official language of Iran.

=== Population ===
At the time of the 2006 National Census, the city's population was 40,578 in 11,550 households. The following census in 2011 counted 43,378 people in 12,695 households. The 2016 census measured the population of the city as 49,403 people in 16,287 households.

== Climate ==
Nowshahr has a humid subtropical climate (Köppen: Cfa, Trewartha: Cf), with warm, humid summers and cool, damp winters.

Climate data for Nowshahr (1991-2020, extremes 1977-2020)
Month	Jan	Feb	Mar	Apr	May	Jun	Jul	Aug	Sep	Oct	Nov	Dec	Year
Record high °C (°F)	25.0 (77.0)	30.0 (86.0)	35.0 (95.0)	35.0 (95.0)	34.0 (93.2)	34.8 (94.6)	35.6 (96.1)	34.0 (93.2)	35.4 (95.7)	36.6 (97.9)	28.0 (82.4)	26.0 (78.8)	36.6 (97.9)
Mean daily maximum °C (°F)	11.6 (52.9)	11.1 (52.0)	13.1 (55.6)	17.0 (62.6)	22.3 (72.1)	26.9 (80.4)	29.1 (84.4)	29.6 (85.3)	26.6 (79.9)	22.5 (72.5)	17.3 (63.1)	13.6 (56.5)	20.1 (68.2)
Daily mean °C (°F)	7.9 (46.2)	7.8 (46.0)	9.9 (49.8)	13.7 (56.7)	19.1 (66.4)	23.6 (74.5)	25.7 (78.3)	26.0 (78.8)	23.0 (73.4)	18.5 (65.3)	13.2 (55.8)	9.5 (49.1)	16.5 (61.7)
Mean daily minimum °C (°F)	4.6 (40.3)	4.7 (40.5)	7.2 (45.0)	10.9 (51.6)	15.9 (60.6)	20.2 (68.4)	22.3 (72.1)	22.6 (72.7)	19.9 (67.8)	15.1 (59.2)	9.8 (49.6)	6.1 (43.0)	13.3 (55.9)
Record low °C (°F)	−4.2 (24.4)	−5.2 (22.6)	−3.0 (26.6)	1.8 (35.2)	5.8 (42.4)	11.0 (51.8)	14.8 (58.6)	15.8 (60.4)	11.8 (53.2)	6.0 (42.8)	−2.0 (28.4)	−1.5 (29.3)	−5.2 (22.6)
Average precipitation mm (inches)	106.5 (4.19)	94.5 (3.72)	87.0 (3.43)	60.0 (2.36)	34.5 (1.36)	44.0 (1.73)	49.1 (1.93)	53.4 (2.10)	177.7 (7.00)	253.5 (9.98)	232.1 (9.14)	132.8 (5.23)	1,325.1 (52.17)
Average precipitation days (≥ 1.0 mm)	9.2	9.1	9.3	7.6	5.7	4.6	4.4	5.9	8.7	9.3	11.1	8.8	93.7
Average snowy days	0.7	0.8	0.3	0.0	0.0	0.0	0.0	0.0	0.0	0.0	0.0	0.2	2
Average relative humidity (%)	81	83	85	84	82	79	80	80	83	84	83	82	82.2
Average dew point °C (°F)	4.7 (40.5)	4.9 (40.8)	7.3 (45.1)	11.0 (51.8)	15.9 (60.6)	19.7 (67.5)	21.8 (71.2)	22.2 (72.0)	19.9 (67.8)	15.6 (60.1)	10.3 (50.5)	6.5 (43.7)	13.3 (56.0)
Mean monthly sunshine hours	127	109	122	141	200	224	212	203	150	155	131	124	1,898
Source 1: NOAA (snowfall 1981-2010)
Source 2: Iran Meteorological Organization

Climate data for Noushahr (1977–2010, extremes 1977-2020)
Month	Jan	Feb	Mar	Apr	May	Jun	Jul	Aug	Sep	Oct	Nov	Dec	Year
Record high °C (°F)	25.0 (77.0)	30.0 (86.0)	35.0 (95.0)	35.0 (95.0)	34.0 (93.2)	34.8 (94.6)	35.6 (96.1)	34.0 (93.2)	35.4 (95.7)	36.6 (97.9)	28.0 (82.4)	26.0 (78.8)	36.6 (97.9)
Mean daily maximum °C (°F)	11.0 (51.8)	10.7 (51.3)	12.3 (54.1)	16.8 (62.2)	21.5 (70.7)	26.1 (79.0)	28.8 (83.8)	28.9 (84.0)	26.3 (79.3)	22.1 (71.8)	17.4 (63.3)	13.6 (56.5)	19.6 (67.3)
Daily mean °C (°F)	7.4 (45.3)	7.5 (45.5)	9.4 (48.9)	13.7 (56.7)	18.4 (65.1)	22.8 (73.0)	25.3 (77.5)	25.5 (77.9)	22.8 (73.0)	18.4 (65.1)	13.6 (56.5)	9.7 (49.5)	16.2 (61.2)
Mean daily minimum °C (°F)	3.8 (38.8)	4.3 (39.7)	6.6 (43.9)	10.7 (51.3)	15.3 (59.5)	19.6 (67.3)	21.9 (71.4)	22.0 (71.6)	19.4 (66.9)	14.6 (58.3)	9.8 (49.6)	5.8 (42.4)	12.8 (55.1)
Record low °C (°F)	−4.2 (24.4)	−5.2 (22.6)	−3.0 (26.6)	1.8 (35.2)	5.8 (42.4)	11.0 (51.8)	14.8 (58.6)	15.8 (60.4)	11.8 (53.2)	6.0 (42.8)	−2.0 (28.4)	−1.5 (29.3)	−5.2 (22.6)
Average precipitation mm (inches)	104.1 (4.10)	87.4 (3.44)	80.4 (3.17)	50.7 (2.00)	47.1 (1.85)	49.5 (1.95)	33.1 (1.30)	64.8 (2.55)	169.2 (6.66)	243.5 (9.59)	199.9 (7.87)	143.1 (5.63)	1,272.8 (50.11)
Average snowfall cm (inches)	3.4 (1.3)	2.3 (0.9)	0.4 (0.2)	0.0 (0.0)	0.0 (0.0)	0.0 (0.0)	0.0 (0.0)	0.0 (0.0)	0.0 (0.0)	0.0 (0.0)	0.0 (0.0)	0.2 (0.1)	6.3 (2.5)
Average precipitation days	11.7	11.9	13.6	11.3	10.8	8.5	6.6	9.4	10.8	12.8	12.3	12.2	131.9
Average snowy days	0.7	0.8	0.3	0.0	0.0	0.0	0.0	0.0	0.0	0.0	0.0	0.2	2
Average relative humidity (%)	84	85	87	86	84	81	79	81	84	85	84	84	84
Average dew point °C (°F)	4.6 (40.3)	4.8 (40.6)	7.0 (44.6)	11.1 (52.0)	15.5 (59.9)	19.6 (67.3)	21.8 (71.2)	22.3 (72.1)	20.0 (68.0)	15.7 (60.3)	10.8 (51.4)	6.8 (44.2)	13.3 (56.0)
Mean monthly sunshine hours	122.5	111.9	114.0	140.8	190.0	206.8	206.6	179.8	147.1	147.1	129.9	119.8	1,816.3
Source 1: Iran Meteorological Organization
Source 2: NOAA (snowfall 1981-2010)

== Industry ==
The city has been slow to industrialise due to environmental considerations and having an already vibrant economy based on tourism, ship transport and agriculture. Nevertheless there are local food processing, timber treatment and steel industries. Recently, a trailer assembly plant has opened in cooperation with the MAZ of Belarus.

== Port facilities ==
The Dual-use port of Noshahr was built by a Dutch contracting firm in the late 1920s and is one of Iran's most active ports on the Caspian Sea.

== Transportation ==
Noshahr Airport, previously a military airbase and currently a civilian-only airport is located on the western part of the city.

== Tourism ==
With its humid, subtropical climate, sea bathing in the waters of the Caspian, and the natural environment of its mountains, Nowshahr has long been a destination for domestic tourism in Iran. It attracts visitors by the hundreds of thousands every year to its hotels and private villas, by virtue of its transport links with the other cities of Northern Iran. During the reign of Mohammad Reza Shah Pahlavi, Nowshahr was known unofficially as the 'second capital' or 'summer capital' of Iran because it was the city in which the Shah and most high-level government officials chose to live and work during the summer months.

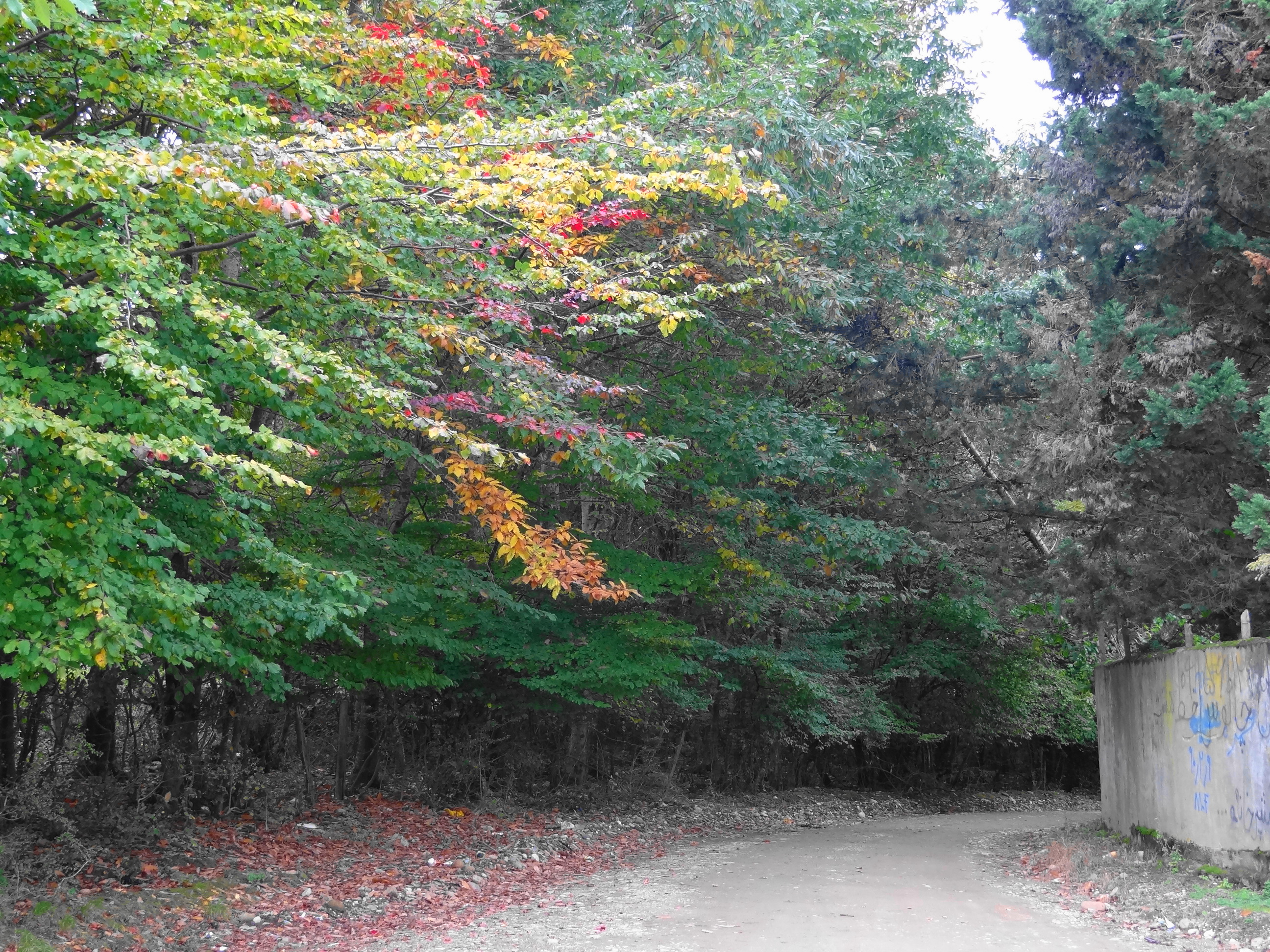
Tourists in July 2012

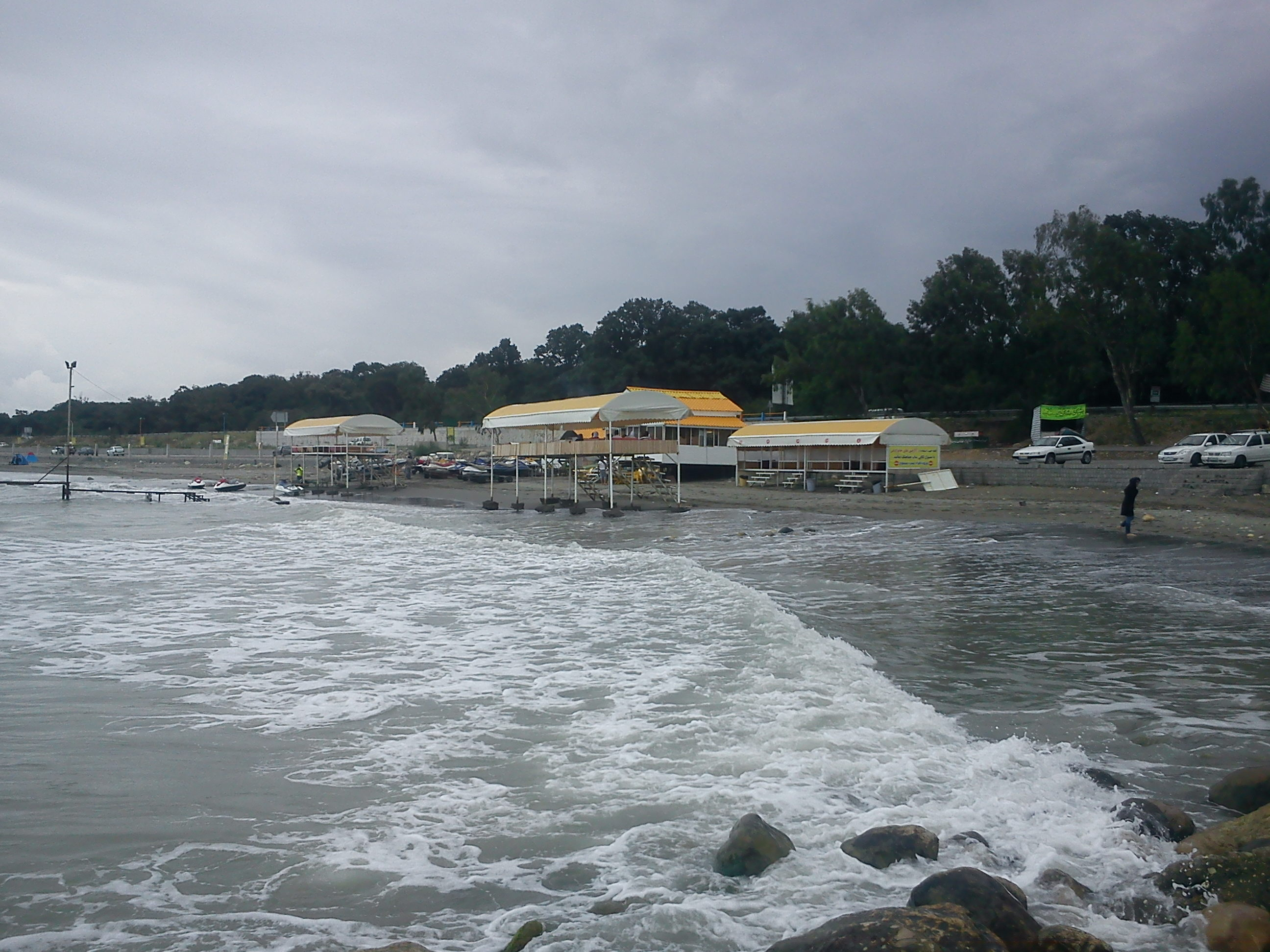
Sisangan Beach

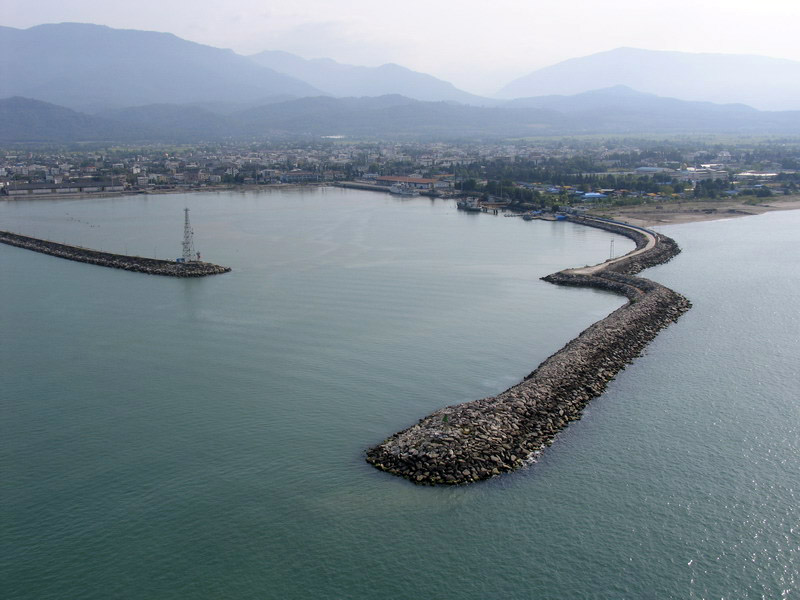
Mole of Nowshahr

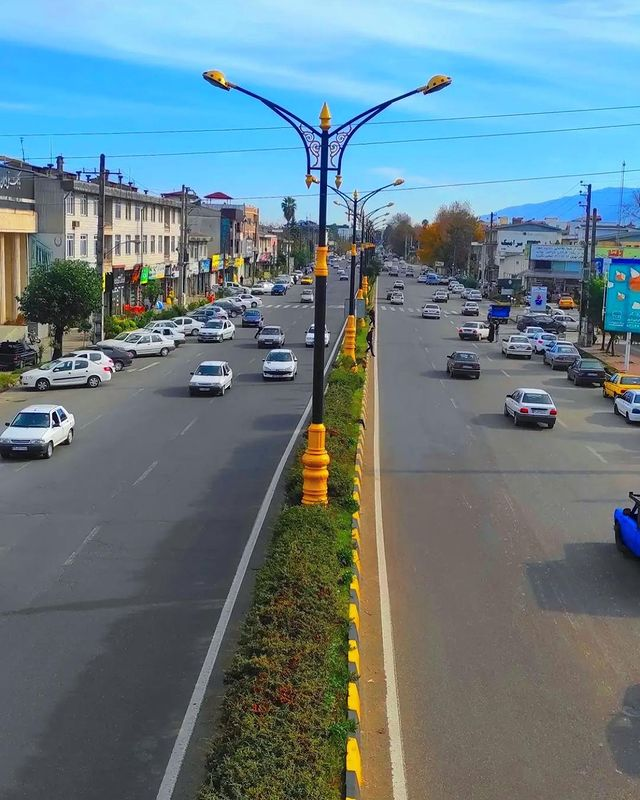
Street in Nowshahr

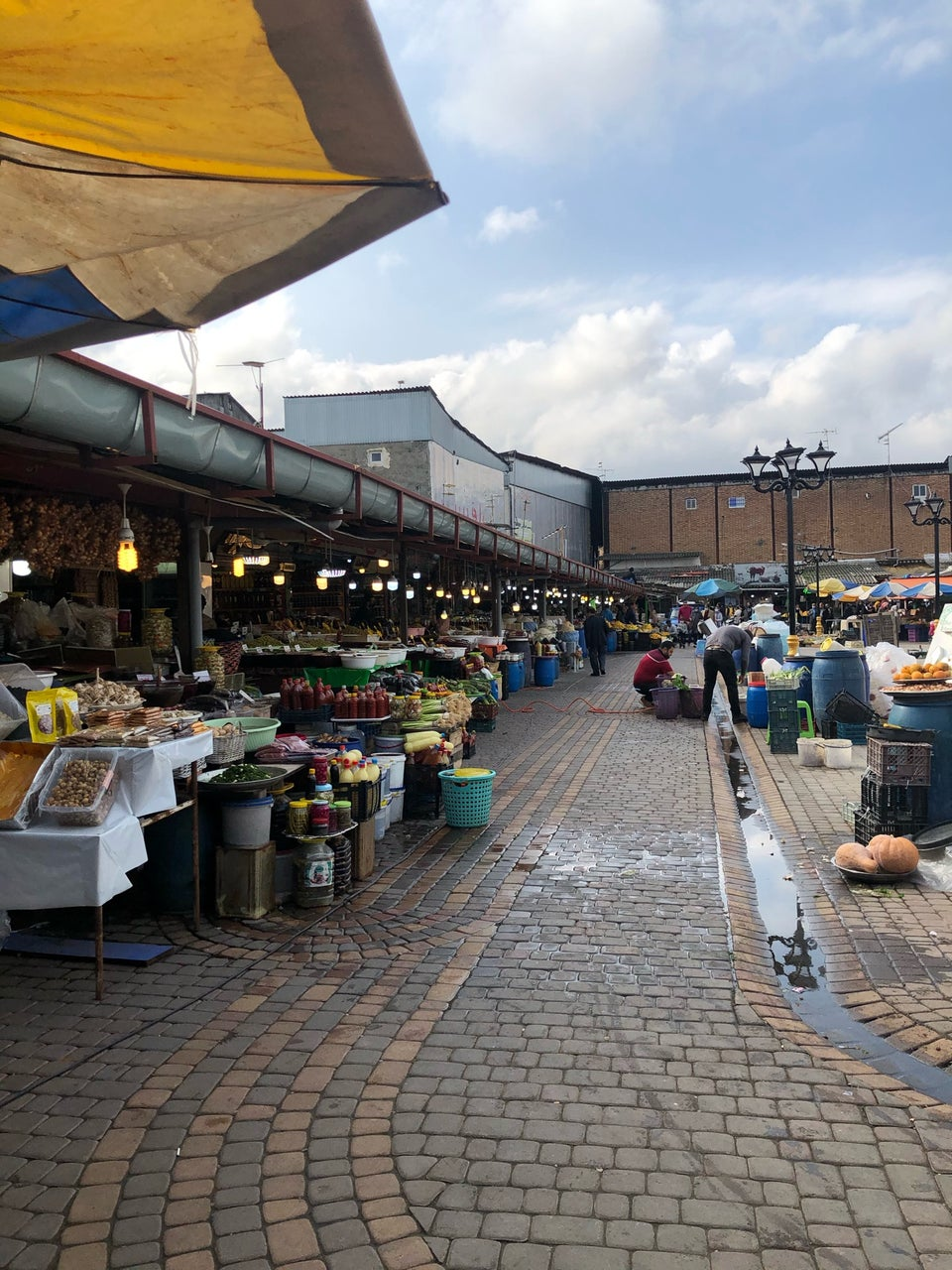
Nowshahr Bazaar

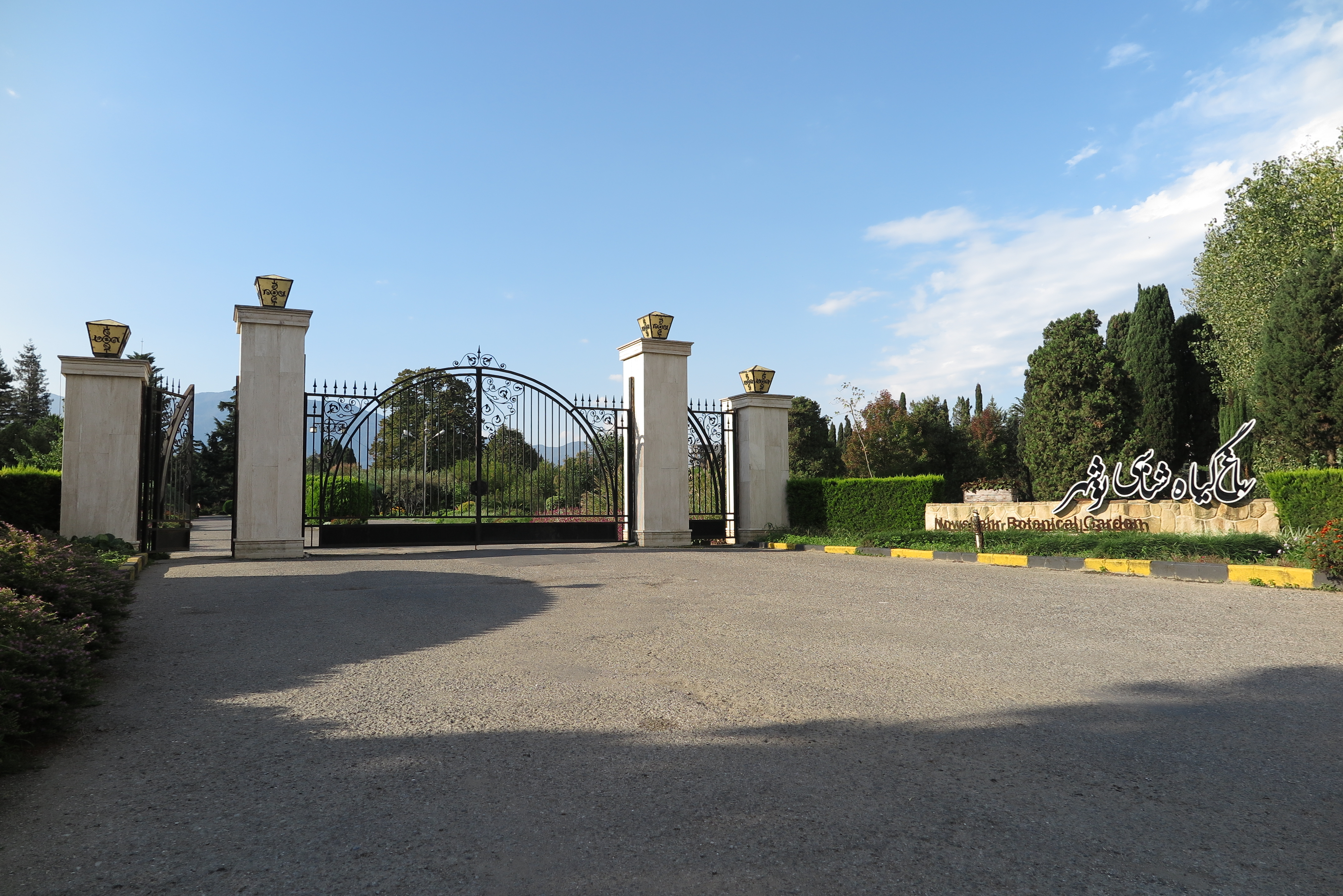
National Botanical Garden of Iran

== Sports and leisure ==
Noshahr was home to the Shamoushak who competed in the Persian Gulf Pro League from 2003 to 2006. Shamoushak folded its football team in 2013.

== Universities ==
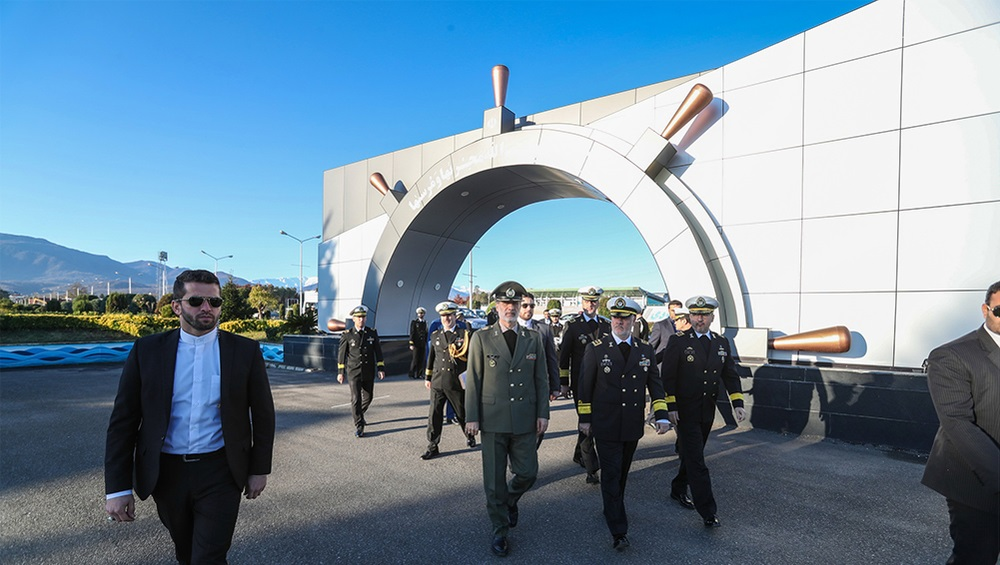
Naval University of Nowshahr

The city is home to Imam Khomeini University for Naval Sciences, some branches and campuses of Azad University of Nowshahr and Chalus, and Royan Institute of Higher Education.

== Notable people ==
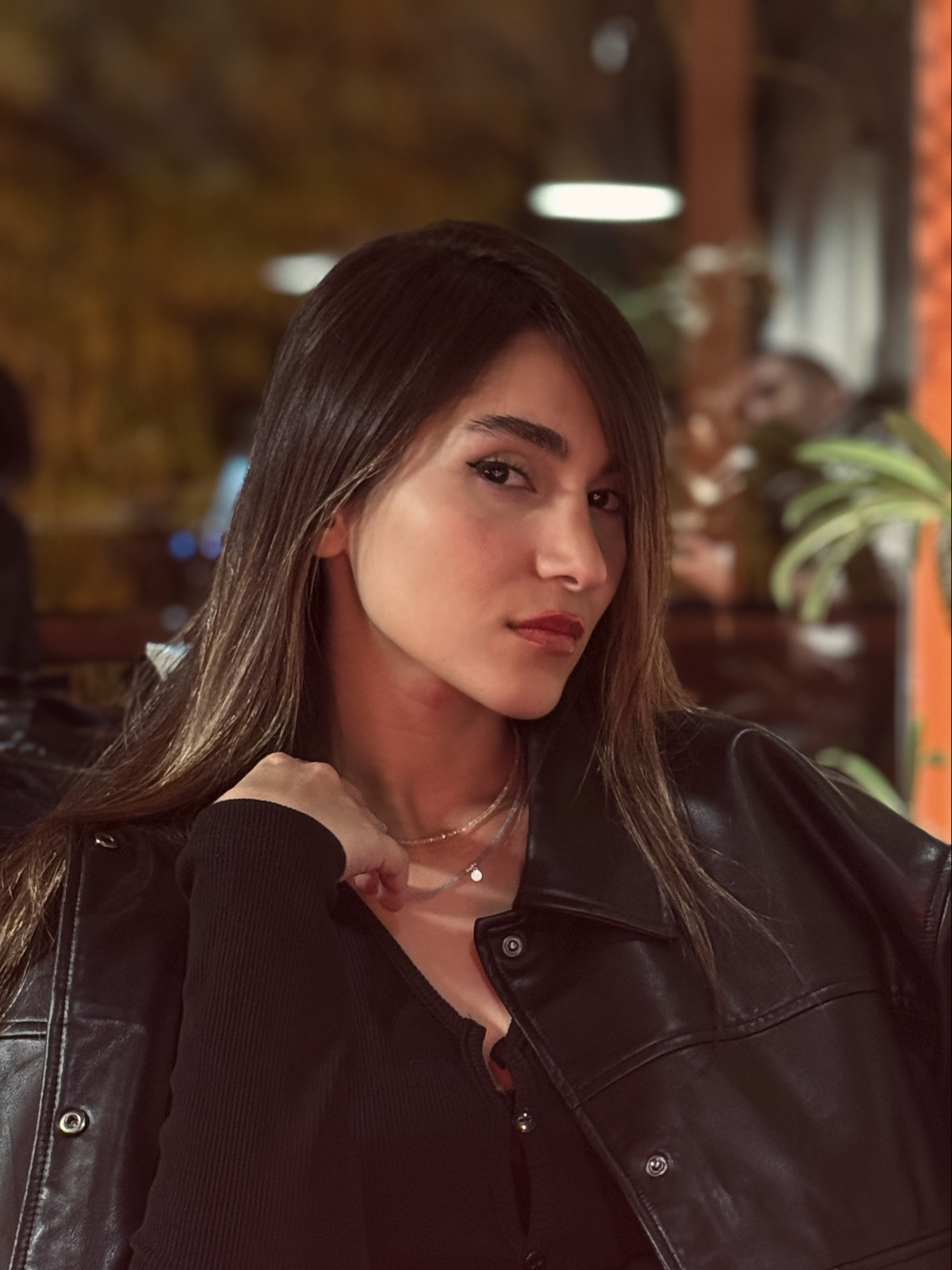
Parastoo Ahmadi

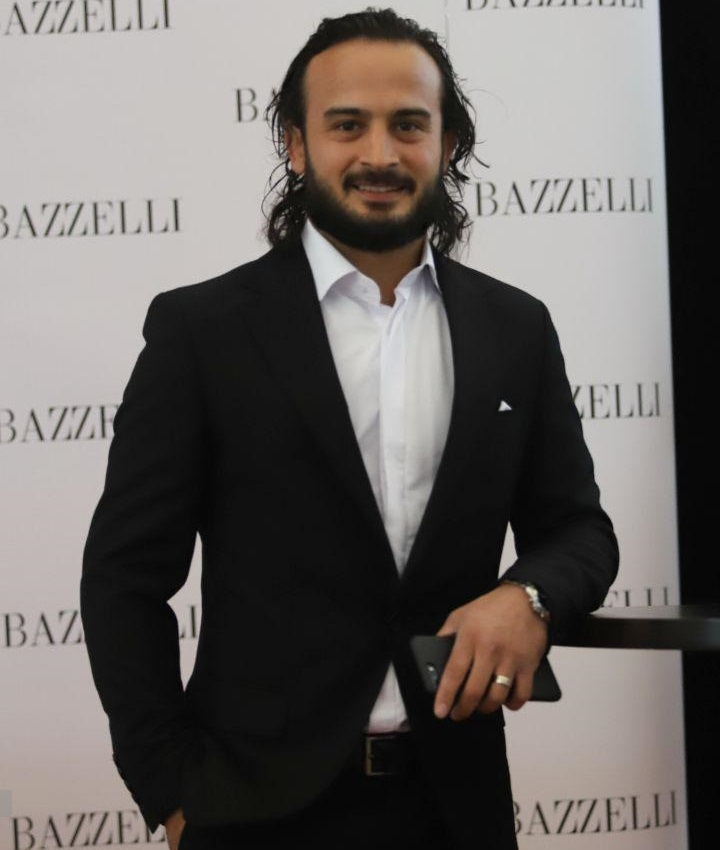
Rahman Ahmadi

- Pooran Farrokhzad (1933–2016) – writer, poet, playwright, and encyclopedist
- Parastoo Ahmadi (b. 1997) – singer sentenced to 74 lashes
- Mohammad Rouyanian (b. 1960) – businessman, football administrator and former Revolutionary Guard commander
- Abdolreza Sheykholeslami (b. 1967) – politician
- Reza Simkhah (b. 1970) – wrestler
- Hassan Rangraz (b. 1980) – wrestler
- Mehdi Bali (b. 1997) – wrestler
- Peyman Hosseini (b. 1984) – beach soccer player
- Mohsen Ashouri (b. 1965) – football player
- Kianoush Rahmati (b. 1978) – football player and manager
- Rahman Ahmadi (b. 1980) – football player and coach
- Bahman Tahmasebi (b. 1980) – football player
- Esmaeil Bale (b. 1985) – football player
- Meysam Hosseini (b. 1987) – football player

== See also ==
Media related to Nowshahr at Wikimedia Commons
