= Central District (Nowshahr County) =

District in Mazandaran province, Iran

Central District (Nowshahr County) Persian: بخش مرکزی شهرستان نوشهر
- District
- Location within Iran
- Coordinates: 36°34′N 51°42′E
- Country: Iran
- Province: Mazandaran
- County: Nowshahr
- Capital: Nowshahr

Population (2016)
  - Total: 118,015
- Time zone: UTC+3:30 (IRST)

The Central District of Nowshahr County (Persian: بخش مرکزی شهرستان نوشهر) is in Mazandaran province, Iran. Its capital is the city of Nowshahr.

== Demographics ==
=== Population ===
At the time of the 2006 National Census, the district's population was 102,131 in 27,814 households. The following census in 2011 counted 108,976 people in 32,279 households. The 2016 census measured the population of the district as 118,015 inhabitants in 38,431 households.

=== Administrative divisions ===
Central District (Nowshahr County) Population
Administrative Divisions	2006	2011	2016
Baladeh Kojur RD	17,085	17,199	18,521
Kalej RD	12,427	12,786	13,727
Kheyrud Kenar RD	32,041	35,613	36,364
Nowshahr (city)	40,578	43,378	49,403
Total	102,131	108,976	118,015
RD = Rural District
