= Barkan (disambiguation) =

Barkan is an Israeli settlement in the West Bank. It may also refer to:

== People ==
- Adi Barkan, Israeli model agent and activist
- Ady Barkan (1983–2023), American lawyer and socialist activist
- Alexander Barkan (1909–1990), American labor leader
- Eyal Barkan, Israeli music producer and DJ
- Joel Barkan (1941–2014), American political scientist
- Leonard Barkan (born 1944), American professor of literature
- Mark Barkan (1934–2020), American songwriter and producer
- Nimrod Barkan (born 1952), Israeli diplomat
- Ross Barkan (born 1989), American journalist and writer
- Seth Flynn Barkan (born 1980), American poet, musician and journalist
- Steven Barkan (born 1951), American sociologist
- Yehuda Barkan (1945–2020), Israeli film actor, producer and director

== Places ==
- Barkan, Nowshahr, a village in Iran
- Barkan, Yemen, a village in Yemen

== Other uses ==
- Havelsan Barkan, a Turkish unmanned ground combat vehicle

== See also ==
- Barkhan (disambiguation)
