= Firuz Kola-ye Olya, Nowshahr =

Village in Mazandaran province, Iran

Firuz Kola-ye Olya Persian: فيروزكلاعليا
- Village
- Location within Iran
- Coordinates: 36°22′15″N 51°47′55″E
- Country: Iran
- Province: Mazandaran
- County: Nowshahr
- District: Kojur
- Rural District: Tavabe-ye Kojur

Population (2016)
  - Total: 192
- Time zone: UTC+3:30 (IRST)

Firuz Kola-ye Olya (Persian: فيروزكلاعليا) (Note: Also romanized as Fīrūz Kolā-ye ‘Olyā; also known as Fīrūz Kalā and Fīrūz Kolā-ye Bālā) is a village in Tavabe-ye Kojur Rural District of Kojur District in Nowshahr County, Mazandaran province, Iran. It is southeast of the village of Firuz Kola-ye Sofla.

== Demographics ==
=== Population ===
At the time of the 2006 National Census, the village's population was 174 in 41 households. The following census in 2011 counted 186 people in 52 households. The 2016 census measured the population of the village as 192 people in 67 households.
