= Hasanabad, Kojur =

Hasanabad حسن اباد
- Village
- Location within Iran
- Coordinates: 36°28′44″N 51°20′57″E
- Country: Iran
- Province: Mazandaran
- County: Nowshahr
- Bakhsh: Kojur
- Rural District: Panjak-e Rastaq

Population (2016)
  - Total: 141
- Time zone: UTC+3:30 (IRST)

Hasanabad (Persian: حسن اباد, also Romanized as Ḩasanābād) is a village in Panjak-e Rastaq Rural District, Kojur District, Nowshahr County, Mazandaran Province, Iran.

It is located in the Alborz mountains.

At the 2016 census, its population was 141, in 65 families.
