= Lal-e Tazehabad =

Lal-e Tazehabad لعل تازه اباد
- Village
- Interactive map of Lal-e Tazehabad
- Coordinates: 36°21′46.25″N 51°27′41.75″E
- Country: Iran
- Province: Mazandaran
- County: Nowshahr
- Bakhsh: Kojur
- Rural District: Panjak-e Rastaq

Population (2016)
  - Total: 66
- Time zone: UTC+3:30 (IRST)

Lal-e Tazehabad (Persian: لعل تازه اباد, romanized: Lʿal-e Tāzehābād) is a village in Panjak-e Rastaq Rural District, Kojur District, Nowshahr County, Mazandaran Province, Iran. At the 2016 census, its population was 66, in 25 families. Up from 59 in 2006.
