= Salehan, Mazandaran =

Village in Mazandaran province, Iran

Salehan Persian: صالحان
- Village
- Location within Iran
- Coordinates: 36°19′29″N 51°46′03″E
- Country: Iran
- Province: Mazandaran
- County: Nowshahr
- District: Kojur
- Rural District: Tavabe-ye Kojur

Population (2016)
  - Total: 364
- Time zone: UTC+3:30 (IRST)

Salehan (Persian: صالحان) (Note: Also romanized as Şāleḩān; also known as Salhūn and Sālihūn) is a village in Tavabe-ye Kojur Rural District of Kojur District in Nowshahr County, Mazandaran province, Iran. It is southeast of the village of Firuz Kola-ye Sofla.

== Demographics ==
=== Population ===
At the time of the 2006 National Census, the village's population was 412 in 127 households. The following census in 2011 counted 470 people in 162 households. The 2016 census measured the population of the village as 364 people in 141 households.
