= Zanus =

Village in Mazandaran province, Iran

Zanus Persian: زانوس
- Village
- Location within Iran
- Coordinates: 36°19′58″N 51°32′37″E
- Country: Iran
- Province: Mazandaran
- County: Nowshahr
- District: Kojur
- Rural District: Zanus Rastaq

Population (2016)
  - Total: 385
- Time zone: UTC+3:30 (IRST)

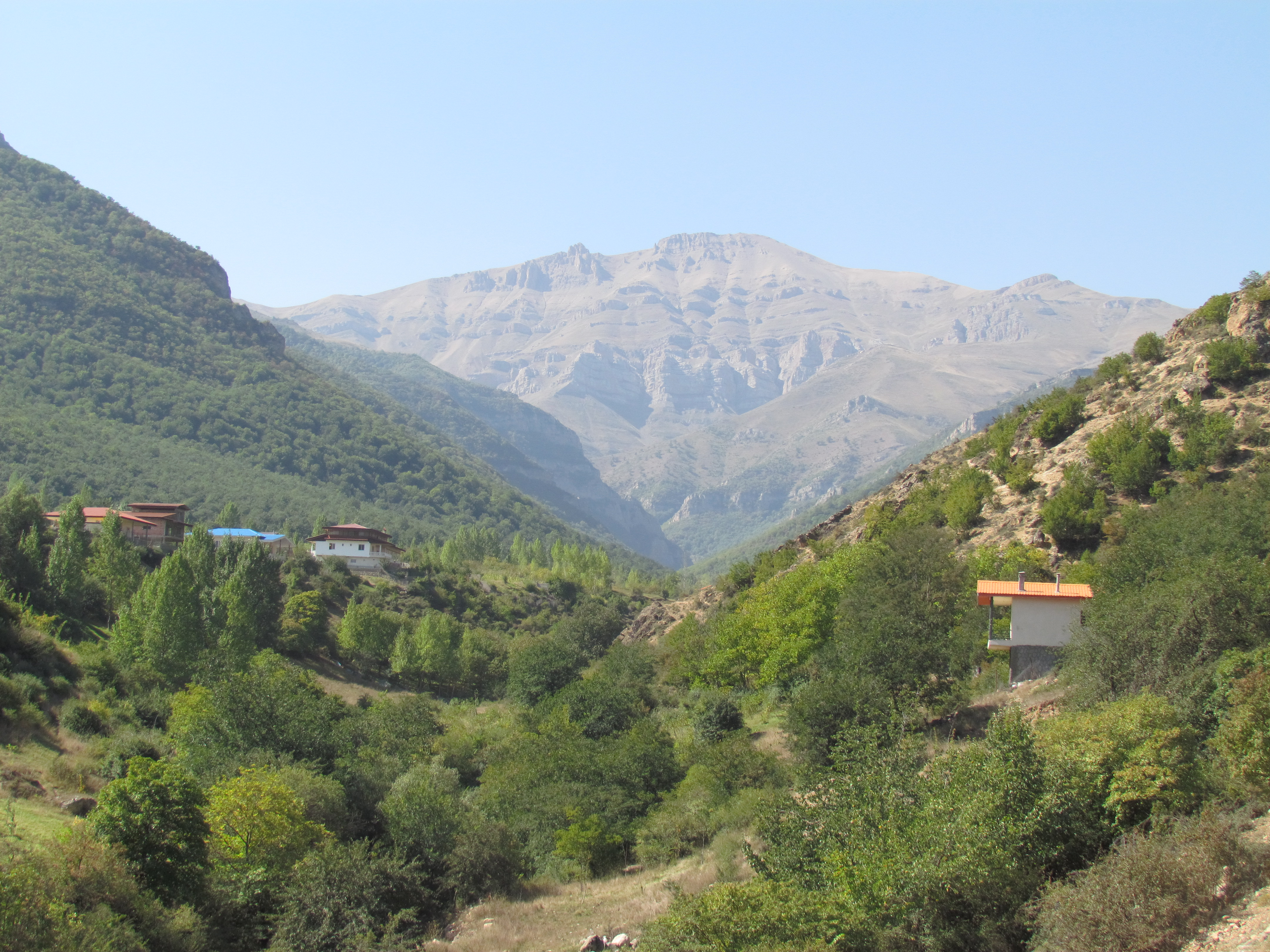
View of the Zanus Strait in 2017

Zanus (Persian: زانوس) (Note: Also romanized as Zānūs) is a village in Zanus Rastaq Rural District of Kojur District in Nowshahr County, Mazandaran province, Iran.

== Demographics ==
=== Population ===
At the time of the 2006 National Census, the village's population was 103 in 38 households. The following census in 2011 counted 214 people in 79 households. The 2016 census measured the population of the village as 385 people in 133 households.
