= Salehan =

Salehan (Persian: صالحان) may refer to:

- Salehan, Kohgiluyeh and Boyer-Ahmad
- Salehan, Mazandaran
- Salehan Rural District, in Markazi Province
