= Nichkuh =

Village in Mazandaran province, Iran

Nichkuh Persian: نيچكوه
- Village
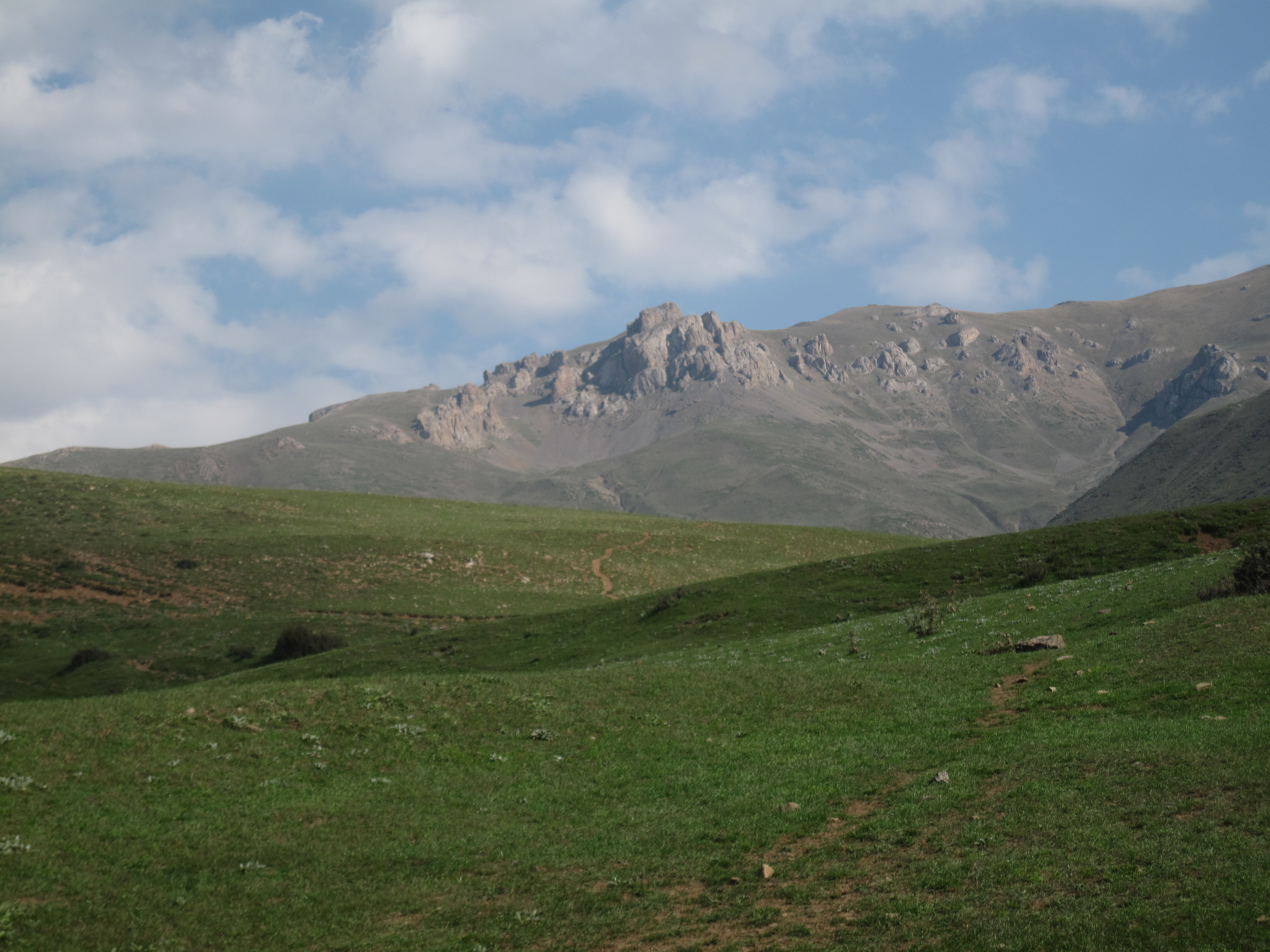
- The village of Nichkuh

- Location within Iran
- Coordinates: 36°17′41″N 51°35′27″E
- Country: Iran
- Province: Mazandaran
- County: Nowshahr
- District: Kojur
- Rural District: Zanus Rastaq

Population (2016)
  - Total: 553
- Time zone: UTC+3:30 (IRST)

Nichkuh (Persian: نيچكوه) (Note: Also romanized as Nīchkūh) is a village in Zanus Rastaq Rural District of Kojur District in Nowshahr County, Mazandaran province, Iran.

== Demographics ==
=== Population ===
At the time of the 2006 National Census, the village's population was 389 in 109 households. The following census in 2011 counted 428 people in 136 households. The 2016 census measured the population of the village as 553 people in 174 households.
