= Pey Deh =

Pey Deh پی ده
- Village
- Location within Iran
- Coordinates: 36°20′02″N 51°34′09″E
- Country: Iran
- Province: Mazandaran
- County: Nowshahr
- Bakhsh: Kojur
- Rural District: Zanus Rastaq

Population (2016)
  - Total: 47
- Time zone: UTC+3:30 (IRST)

Pey Deh (Persian: پی ده, also Romanized as Paideh) is a village in Zanus Rastaq Rural District, Kojur District, Nowshahr County, Mazandaran Province, Iran. At the 2016 census, its population was 47, in 21 families. Large decrease from 700 people in 2006.
