= Hezar Khal =

Hezar Khal هزارخال
- Village
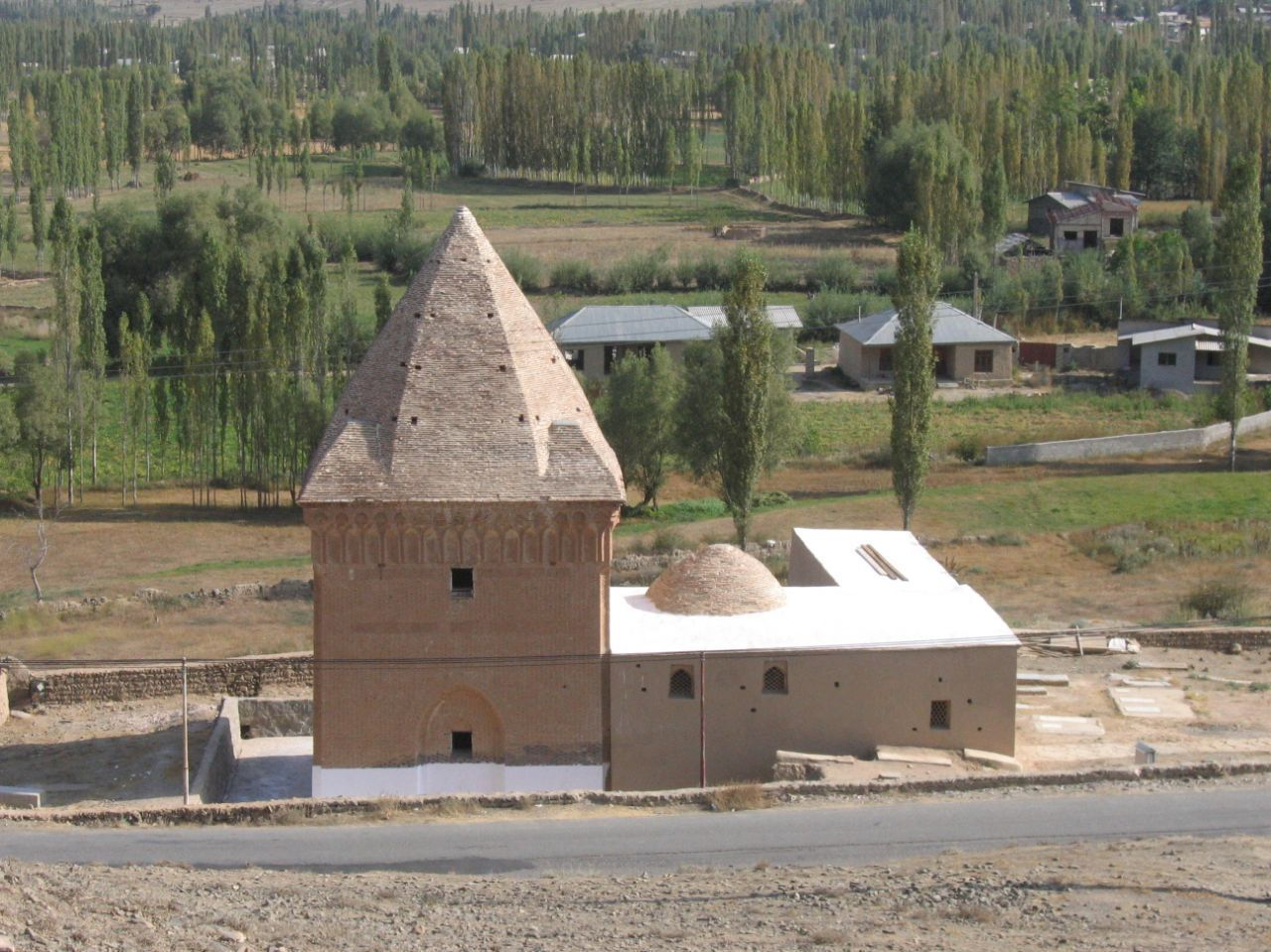
- A shrine in Hezar Khal

- Location within Iran
- Coordinates: 36°20′38″N 51°44′46″E
- Country: Iran
- Province: Mazandaran
- County: Nowshahr
- Bakhsh: Kojur
- Rural District: Tavabe-e Kojur

Population (2016)
  - Total: 99
- Time zone: UTC+3:30 (IRST)

Hezar Khal (Persian: هزارخال, also Romanized as Hezār Khāl) is a village in Tavabe-e Kojur Rural District, Kojur District, Nowshahr County, Mazandaran Province, Iran. At the 2016 census, its population was 99, in 35 families.
