= Shah Najer =

Shah Najer شاه ناجر
- Village
- Location within Iran
- Coordinates: 36°18′13″N 51°46′12″E
- Country: Iran
- Province: Mazandaran
- County: Nowshahr
- Bakhsh: Kojur
- Rural District: Tavabe-e Kojur

Population (2006)
  - Total: 105
- Time zone: UTC+3:30 (IRST)

Shah Najer (Persian: شاه ناجر, also Romanized as Shāh Nājer) is a village in Tavabe-e Kojur Rural District, Kojur District, Nowshahr County, Mazandaran Province, Iran. At the 2016 census, its population was 86, in 39 families. Down from 105 people in 2006.
