= Kalik, Nowshahr =

Kalik کلیک
- Village
- Location within Iran
- Coordinates: 36°28′28″N 51°39′30″E
- Country: Iran
- Province: Mazandaran
- County: Nowshahr
- Bakhsh: Kojur
- Rural District: Tavabe-e Kojur

Population (2006)
  - Total: 149
- Time zone: UTC+3:30 (IRST)

Kalik (Persian: کلیک, also Romanized as Kalīk and Kolyak) is a village in Tavabe-e Kojur Rural District, Kojur District, Nowshahr County, Mazandaran Province, Iran. At the 2016 census, its population was 67, in 27 families. Down from 149 people in 2006.
