= Bin, Iran =

Bin بين
- Village
- Location within Iran
- Coordinates: 36°27′36″N 51°41′22″E
- Country: Iran
- Province: Mazandaran
- County: Nowshahr
- Bakhsh: Kojur
- Rural District: Tavabe-e Kojur

Population (2016)
  - Total: 54
- Time zone: UTC+3:30 (IRST)

Bin (Persian: بين, also Romanized as Bīn) is a village in Tavabe-e Kojur Rural District, Kojur District, Nowshahr County, Mazandaran Province, Iran. At the 2016 census, its population was 54, in 19 families. Up from 41 people in 2006.
