= Astan-e Karud =

Astan-e Karud استانكرود
- Village
- Location within Iran
- Coordinates: 36°24′00″N 51°33′00″E
- Country: Iran
- Province: Mazandaran
- County: Nowshahr
- Bakhsh: Kojur
- Rural District: Zanus Rastaq

Population (2016)
  - Total: 61
- Time zone: UTC+3:30 (IRST)

Astan-e Karud (Persian: استانكرود, also Romanized as Āstān-e Karūd and Āstān Karūd; also known as Arsinkirūd, Ashin Kirūd, Āstānak Rūd, and Āstāneh Karūd) is a village in Zanus Rastaq Rural District, Kojur District, Nowshahr County, Mazandaran Province, Iran. At the 2006 census, its population was 76, in 24 families. Down to 61 people and 23 households in 2016.
