= Kandis Kola =

Kandis Kola كنديس كلا
- Village
- Location within Iran
- Coordinates: 36°28′16″N 51°27′56″E
- Country: Iran
- Province: Mazandaran
- County: Nowshahr
- Bakhsh: Kojur
- Rural District: Panjak-e Rastaq

Population (2016)
  - Total: 52
- Time zone: UTC+3:30 (IRST)

Kandis Kola (Persian: كنديس كلا, also Romanized as Kandīs Kolā; also known as Gondes Kolā and Kondes Kolā) is a village in Panjak-e Rastaq Rural District, Kojur District, Nowshahr County, Mazandaran Province, Iran. At the 2016 census, its population was 52, in 24 families. Down from 64 in 2006.
