= Kashkak, Mazandaran =

Kashkak کشکک
- Village
- Location within Iran
- Coordinates: 36°24′26″N 51°39′25″E
- Country: Iran
- Province: Mazandaran
- County: Nowshahr
- Bakhsh: Kojur
- Rural District: Zanus Rastaq

Population (2016)
  - Total: 163
- Time zone: UTC+3:30 (IRST)

Kashkak (Persian: کشکک; also known as Kūshkak) is a village in Zanus Rastaq Rural District, Kojur District, Nowshahr County, Mazandaran Province, Iran. At the 2016 census, its population was 163, in 54 families. Increased from 85 people in 2006.
