= Bastam, Mazandaran =

Village in Mazandaran province, Iran

Bastam Persian: بسطام
- Village
- Location within Iran
- Coordinates: 36°26′42″N 51°21′17″E
- Country: Iran
- Province: Mazandaran
- County: Nowshahr
- District: Kojur
- Rural District: Panjak-e Rastaq

Population (2016)
  - Total: 247
- Time zone: UTC+3:30 (IRST)

Bastam (Persian: بسطام) (Note: Also romanized as Basţām) is a village in Panjak-e Rastaq Rural District of Kojur District in Nowshahr County, Mazandaran province, Iran.

== Demographics ==
=== Population ===
At the time of the 2006 National Census, the village's population was 377 in 80 households. The following census in 2011 counted 254 people in 83 households. The 2016 census measured the population of the village as 247 people in 90 households.
