= Nimvar, Mazandaran =

Nimvar نيمور
- Village
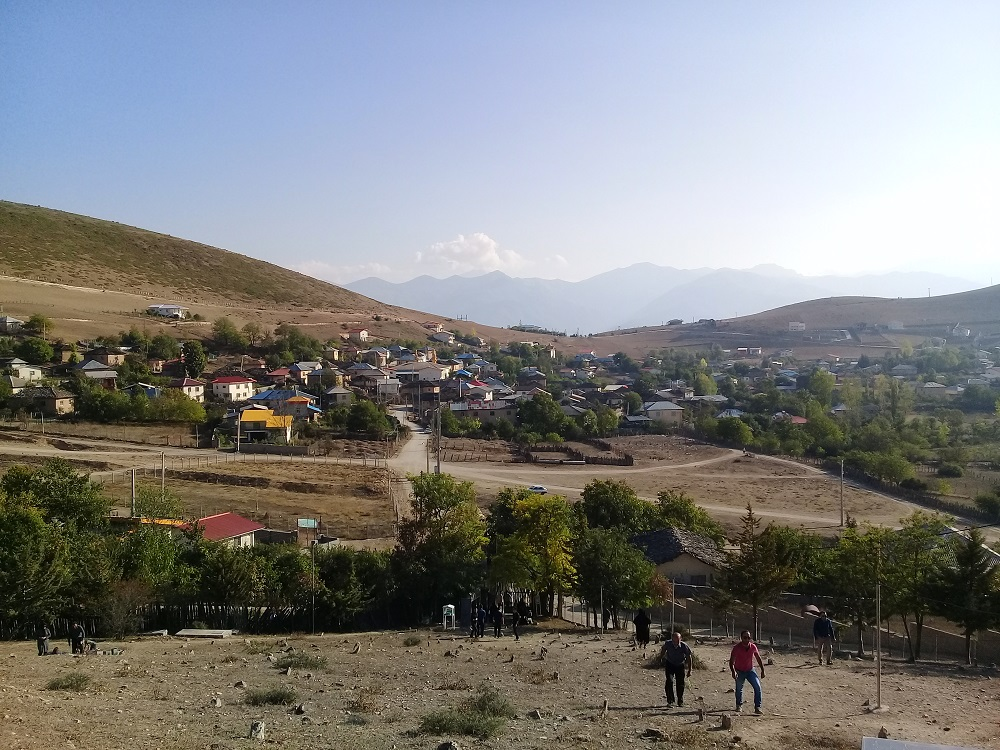
- Nimvar

- Location within Iran
- Coordinates: 36°26′29″N 51°35′06″E
- Country: Iran
- Province: Mazandaran
- County: Nowshahr
- Bakhsh: Kojur
- Rural District: Zanus Rastaq

Population (2016)
  - Total: 112
- Time zone: UTC+3:30 (IRST)

Nimvar (Persian: نيمور, also Romanized as Nīmvar) is a village in Zanus Rastaq Rural District, Kojur District, Nowshahr County, Mazandaran Province, Iran. At the 2006 census, its population was 99, in 34 families. Up to 112 people and 43 households in 2016.
