= Neytal =

Neytal (Neytel) نیتل
- Village
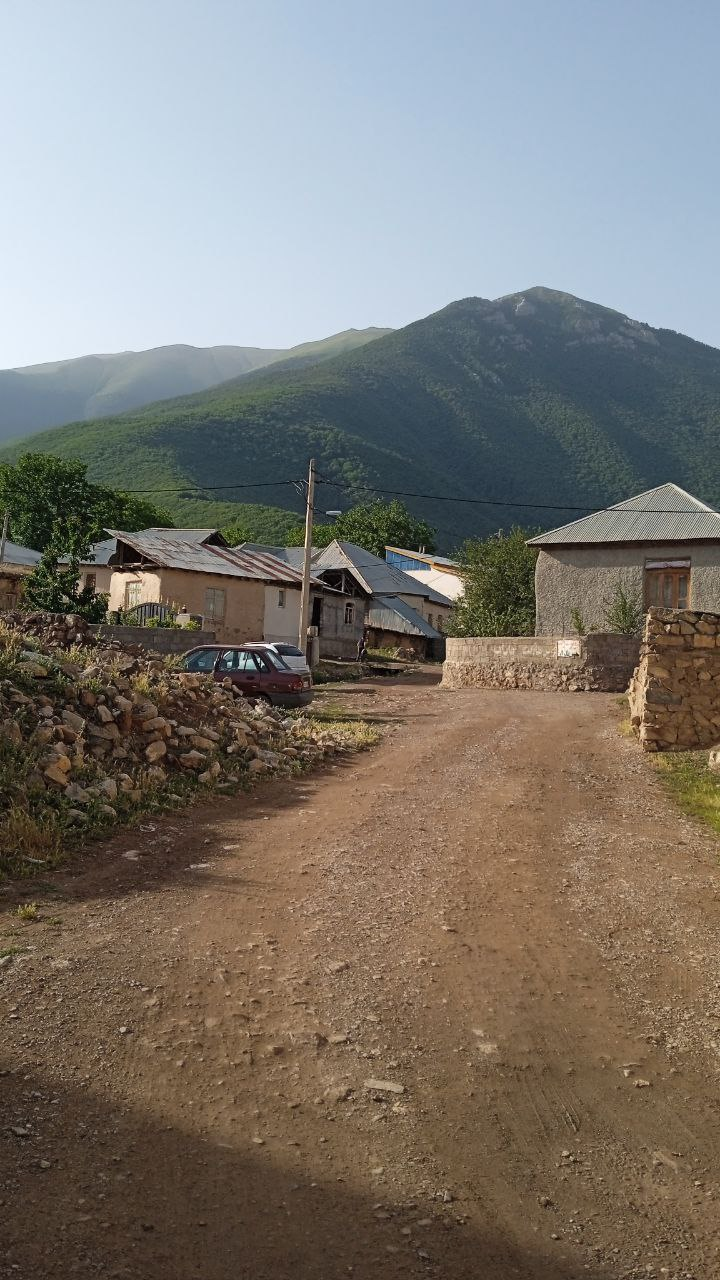
- Neytal, mazandaran province

- Location within Iran
- Coordinates: 36°17′28″N 51°44′06″E
- Country: Iran
- Province: Mazandaran
- County: Nowshahr
- Bakhsh: Kojur
- Rural District: Tavabe-e Kojur

Population (2006)
  - Total: 91
- Time zone: UTC+3:30 (IRST)

Neytal (Persian: نيتل; also known as Neytel and Neital) is a village in Tavabe-e Kojur Rural District, Kojur District, Nowshahr County, Mazandaran Province, Iran. At the 2016 census, its population was 63, in 30 families. Down from 91 in 2006 census.
