= Sarus, Iran =

Sarus ساروس
- Village
- Location within Iran
- Coordinates: 36°30′26″N 51°23′00″E
- Country: Iran
- Province: Mazandaran
- County: Nowshahr
- Bakhsh: Kojur
- Rural District: Panjak-e Rastaq

Population (2016)
  - Total: 33
- Time zone: UTC+3:30 (IRST)

Sarus (Persian: ساروس, also Romanized as Sārūs) is a village in Panjak-e Rastaq Rural District, Kojur District, Nowshahr County, Mazandaran Province, Iran. At the 2016 census, its population was 33, in 16 families. Increased from 19 people in 2006.
