= Dasht-e Nazir =

Village in Mazandaran province, Iran

Dasht-e Nazir Persian: دشت نظیر
- Village
- Location within Iran
- Coordinates: 36°25′09″N 51°25′50″E
- Country: Iran
- Province: Mazandaran
- County: Nowshahr
- District: Kojur
- Rural District: Panjak-e Rastaq

Population (2016)
  - Total: 252
- Time zone: UTC+3:30 (IRST)

Dasht-e Nazir (Persian: دشت نظیر) (Note: Also romanized as Dasht Naz̧īr, Dasht-e Naz̧īr, and Dasht-i-Nazīr; also known as Dasht Naţīz) is a village in, and the capital of, Panjak-e Rastaq Rural District in Kojur District of Nowshahr County, Mazandaran province, Iran.

== Demographics ==
=== Population ===
At the time of the 2006 National Census, the village's population was 247 in 69 households. The following census in 2011 counted 250 people in 79 households. The 2016 census measured the population of the village as 252 people in 77 households.
