= Pol-e Zoghal =

Pol-e Zoghal پل ذغال
- Village
- Location within Iran
- Coordinates: 36°31′00″N 51°20′00″E
- Country: Iran
- Province: Mazandaran
- County: Nowshahr
- Bakhsh: Kojur
- Rural District: Panjak-e Rastaq

Population (2006)
  - Total: 12
- Time zone: UTC+3:30 (IRST)

Pol-e Zoghal (Persian: پل ذغال, also Romanized as Pol-e Z̄oghāl) is a village in Panjak-e Rastaq Rural District, Kojur District, Nowshahr County, Mazandaran Province, Iran. At the 2006 census, its population was 12, in 4 families.

At the time of 2016 census, the village had no residents.
