= Naserabad, Nowshahr =

Village in Mazandaran province, Iran

Naserabad Persian: ناصراباد
- Village
- Location within Iran
- Coordinates: 36°24′19″N 51°28′22″E
- Country: Iran
- Province: Mazandaran
- County: Nowshahr
- District: Kojur
- Rural District: Panjak-e Rastaq

Population (2016)
  - Total: 302
- Time zone: UTC+3:30 (IRST)

Naserabad (Persian: ناصراباد) (Note: Also romanized as Nāşerābād) is a village in Panjak-e Rastaq Rural District of Kojur District in Nowshahr County, Mazandaran province, Iran. Naserabad has a mountainous and cold climate, and is known as the center of cherry production.

== Demographics ==
=== Population ===
At the time of the 2006 National Census, the village's population was 309 in 71 households. The following census in 2011 counted 287 people in 94 households. The 2016 census measured the population of the village as 302 people in 102 households.
