= Vashkan =

Vashkan واشكن
- Village
- Location within Iran
- Coordinates: 36°18′46″N 51°43′08″E
- Country: Iran
- Province: Mazandaran
- County: Nowshahr
- Bakhsh: Kojur
- Rural District: Tavabe-e Kojur

Population (2006)
  - Total: 47
- Time zone: UTC+3:30 (IRST)

Vashkan (Persian: واشكن, also Romanized as Vāshkan) is a village in Tavabe-e Kojur Rural District, Kojur District, Nowshahr County, Mazandaran Province, Iran. At the 2016 census, its population was 14, in 7 families. Down from 47 in 2006.
