= Lashkenar =

Lashkenar or Lash Kenar (Persian: لشكنار) may refer to:

- Lashkenar, Nowshahr
- Lash Kenar, Nur
