= Lashak =

Village in Mazandaran province, Iran

Lashak Persian: لاشک
- Village
- Location within Iran
- Coordinates: 36°22′13″N 51°39′30″E
- Country: Iran
- Province: Mazandaran
- County: Nowshahr
- District: Kojur
- Rural District: Zanus Rastaq

Population (2016)
  - Total: 786
- Time zone: UTC+3:30 (IRST)

Lashak (Persian: لاشک) (Note: Also romanized as Lāshak) is a village in Zanus Rastaq Rural District of Kojur District in Nowshahr County, Mazandaran province, Iran.

== Demographics ==
=== Population ===
At the time of the 2006 National Census, the village's population was 214 in 83 households. The following census in 2011 counted 230 people in 88 households. The 2016 census measured the population of the village as 786 people in 269 households.

== Notable people ==
Fazlullah Nouri, prominent former political cleric
