= Kandusar =

Kandusar كندوسر
- Village
- Location within Iran
- Coordinates: 36°23′15″N 51°22′33″E
- Country: Iran
- Province: Mazandaran
- County: Nowshahr
- Bakhsh: Kojur
- Rural District: Panjak-e Rastaq

Population (2016)
  - Total: 133
- Time zone: UTC+3:30 (IRST)

Kandusar (Persian: كندوسر, also Romanized as Kandūsar) is a village in Panjak-e Rastaq Rural District, Kojur District, Nowshahr County, Mazandaran Province, Iran. At the 2016 census, its population was 133, in 46 families. Increased from 48 people in 2006.
