= Manjir =

Manjir (Persian: منجير) may refer to:

- Manjir, Khuzestan
- Manjir, Mazandaran

== See also ==
- Azad Manjir
