= Khvorshidabad, Mazandaran =

Khvorshidabad خورشيداباد
- Village
- Location within Iran
- Coordinates: 36°26′07″N 51°27′09″E
- Country: Iran
- Province: Mazandaran
- County: Nowshahr
- Bakhsh: Kojur
- Rural District: Panjak-e Rastaq

Population (2006)
  - Total: 13
- Time zone: UTC+3:30 (IRST)

Khvorshidabad (Persian: خورشيداباد, also Romanized as Khvorshīdābād and Khowrshīdābād) is a village in Panjak-e Rastaq Rural District, Kojur District, Nowshahr County, Mazandaran Province, Iran.

At the time of the 2006 National Census, the village's population was 13 in 4 households. In 2016 census, there were no households residing in the village.
