= Heyrat =

Heyrat حيرت site: heyratnews.ir
- Village
- Location within Iran
- Coordinates: 36°27′38″N 51°27′13″E
- Country: Iran
- Province: Mazandaran
- County: Nowshahr
- Bakhsh: Kojur
- Rural District: Panjak-e Rastaq

Population (2016)
  - Total: 208
- Time zone: UTC+3:30 (IRST)

Heyrat (Persian: حيرت, also Romanized as Ḩeyrat; also known as Ḩeyrat Kojūr) is a village in Panjak-e Rastaq Rural District, Kojur District, Nowshahr County, Mazandaran Province, Iran. At the 2016 census, its population was 208, in 82 families. Down from 255 people in 2006.
