= Mir Kola =

Mir Kala ميركلا
- Village
- Location within Iran
- Coordinates: 36°19′37″N 51°34′11″E
- Country: Iran
- Province: Mazandaran
- County: Nowshahr
- Bakhsh: Kojur
- Rural District: Zanus Rastaq

Population (2016)
  - Total: 214
- Time zone: UTC+3:30 (IRST)

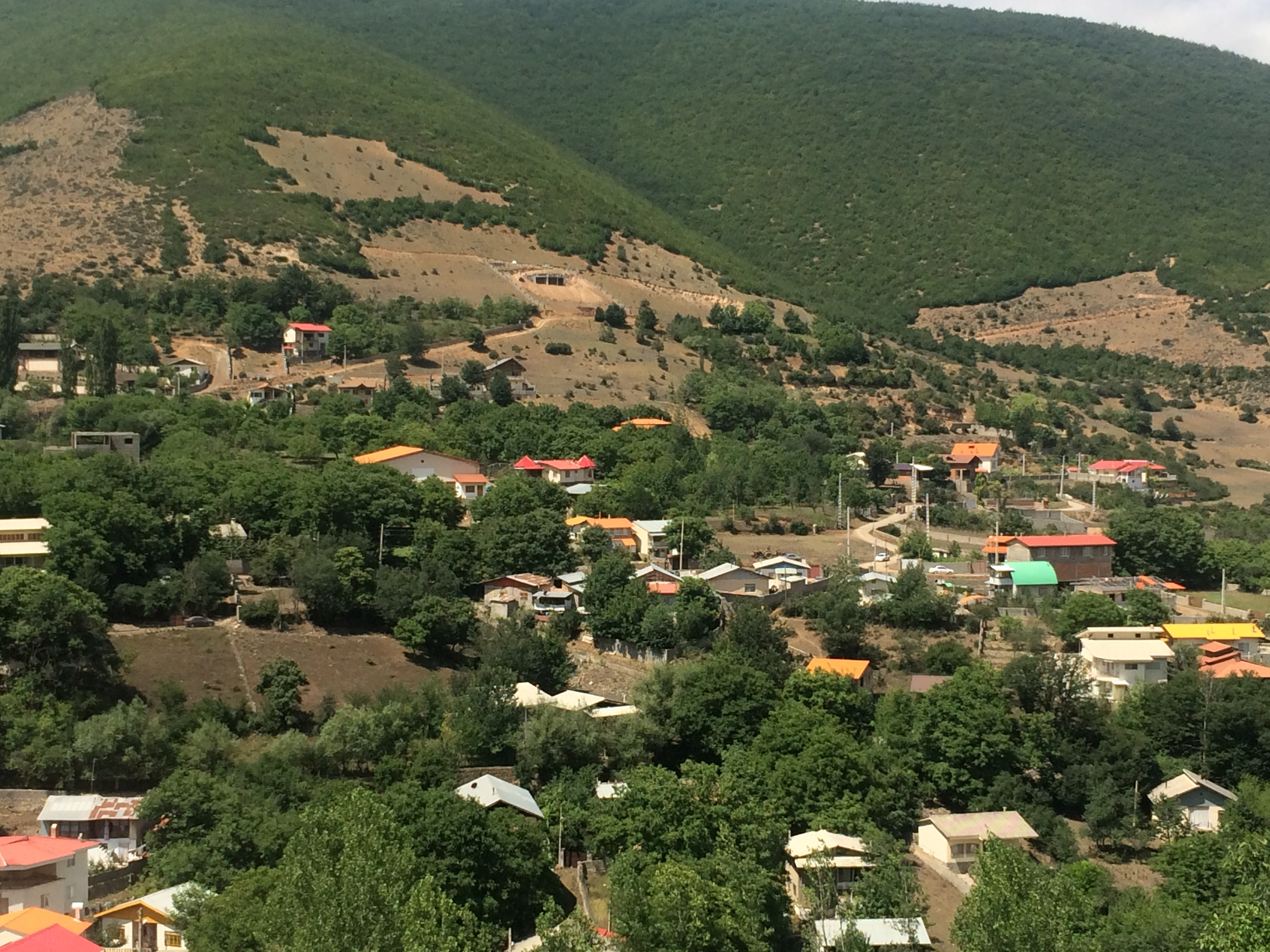
Picture of the village of Mir Kola in Iran

Mir Kola (Persian: ميركلا, also Romanized as Mīr Kolā, 'Mīr Kalā, and Mirkola) is a village in Zanus Rastaq Rural District, Kojur District, Nowshahr County, Mazandaran Province, Iran. At the 2016 census, its population was 214, in 78 families. Increased from 62 people in 2006.
