= Kodir =

Village in Mazandaran province, Iran

Kodir Persian: كدير
- Village
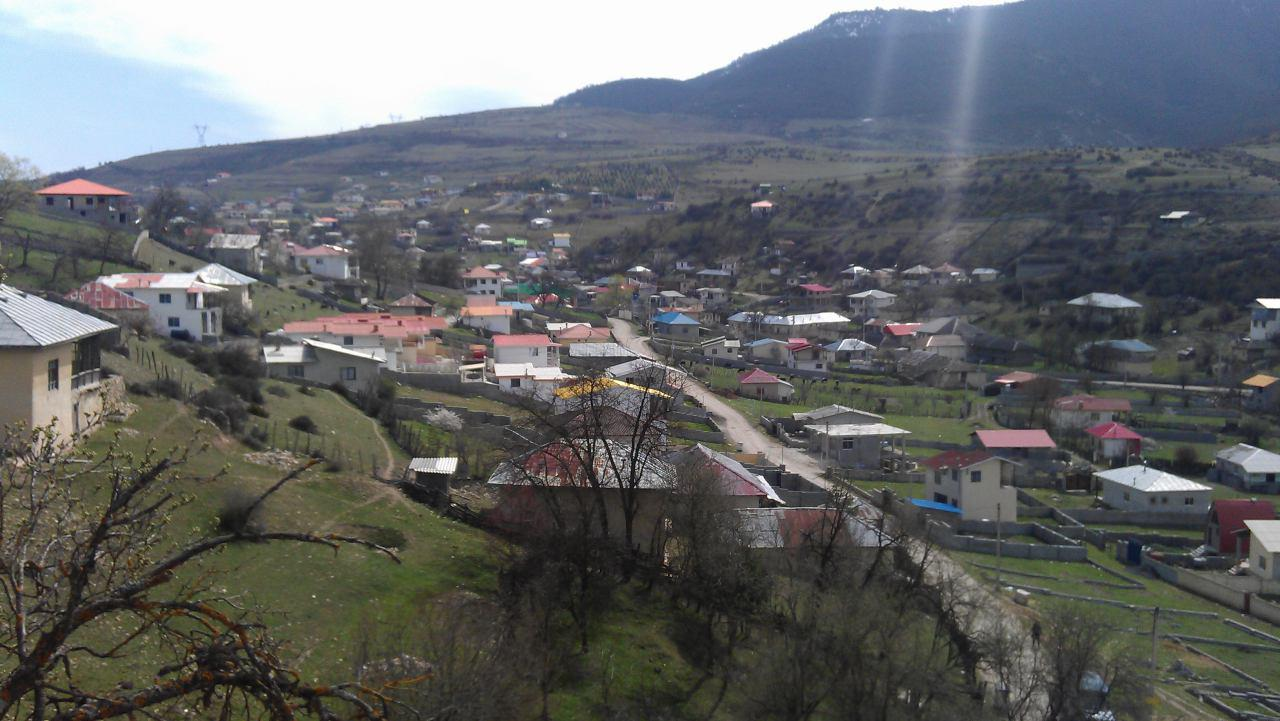
- The village of Kodir

- Location within Iran
- Coordinates: 36°26′58″N 51°47′01″E
- Country: Iran
- Province: Mazandaran
- County: Nowshahr
- District: Kojur
- Rural District: Tavabe-ye Kojur

Population (2016)
  - Total: 178
- Time zone: UTC+3:30 (IRST)

Kodir (Persian: كدير) (Note: Also romanized as Kodīr; also known as Korīr) is a village in Tavabe-ye Kojur Rural District of Kojur District in Nowshahr County, Mazandaran province, Iran.

== Demographics ==
=== Population ===
At the time of the 2006 National Census, the village's population was 137 in 41 households. The following census in 2011 counted 158 people in 73 households. The 2016 census measured the population of the village as 178 people in 67 households.

== See also ==
Media related to Kodir at Wikimedia Commons
