= Angas, Iran =

Village in Mazandaran province, Iran

Angas Persian: انگاس
- Village
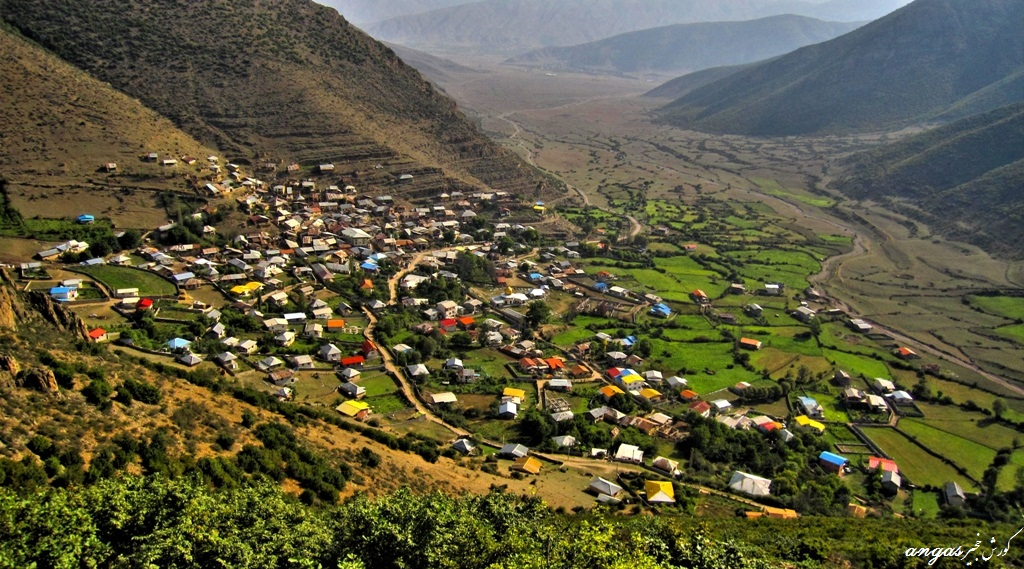
- The village of Angas

- Location within Iran
- Coordinates: 36°18′14″N 51°40′44″E
- Country: Iran
- Province: Mazandaran
- County: Nowshahr
- District: Kojur
- Rural District: Tavabe-ye Kojur

Population (2016)
  - Total: 272
- Time zone: UTC+3:30 (IRST)

Angas (Persian: انگاس) (Note: Also romanized as Angās; also known as Angāsh) is a village in Tavabe-ye Kojur Rural District of Kojur District in Nowshahr County, Mazandaran province, Iran.

== Demographics ==
=== Population ===
At the time of the 2006 National Census, the village's population was 125 in 42 households. The following census in 2011 counted 121 people in 44 households. The 2016 census measured the population of the village as 272 people in 98 households.
