= Pey Chelu =

Village in Mazandaran province, Iran

Pey Chelu Persian: پی چلو
- Village
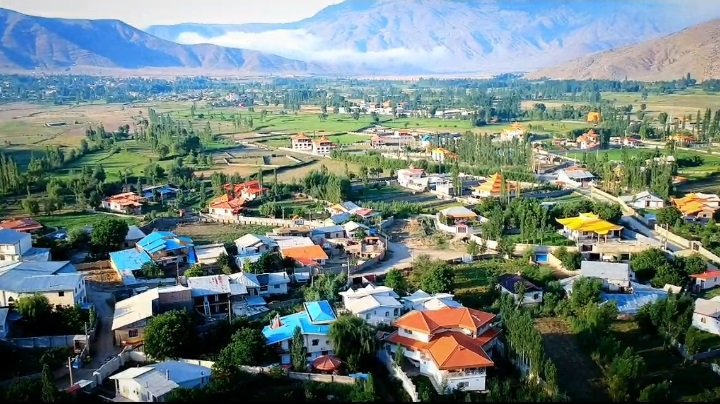
- The village of Pey Chelu

- Location within Iran
- Coordinates: 36°21′56″N 51°43′46″E
- Country: Iran
- Province: Mazandaran
- County: Nowshahr
- District: Kojur
- Rural District: Tavabe-ye Kojur

Population (2016)
  - Total: 175
- Time zone: UTC+3:30 (IRST)

Pey Chelu (Persian: پی چلو) (Note: Also romanized as Pi Chelow and Pī Chelow) is a village in Tavabe-ye Kojur Rural District of Kojur District in Nowshahr County, Mazandaran province, Iran.

== Demographics ==
=== Population ===
At the time of the 2006 National Census, the village's population was 123 in 37 households. The following census in 2011 counted 60 people in 21 households. The 2016 census measured the population of the village as 175 people in 56 households.
