= Chamar Kuh =

Village in Mazandaran province, Iran

Chamar Kuh Persian: چمركوه
- Village
- Location within Iran
- Coordinates: 36°24′32″N 51°42′48″E
- Country: Iran
- Province: Mazandaran
- County: Nowshahr
- District: Kojur
- Rural District: Tavabe-ye Kojur

Population (2016)
  - Total: 181
- Time zone: UTC+3:30 (IRST)

Chamar Kuh (Persian: چمركوه) (Note: Also romanized as Chamar Kūh and Chemerkouh) is a village in Tavabe-ye Kojur Rural District of Kojur District in Nowshahr County, Mazandaran province, Iran.

== Demographics ==
=== Population ===
At the time of the 2006 National Census, the village's population was 82 in 20 households. The following census in 2011 counted 86 people in 24 households. The 2016 census measured the population of the village as 181 people in 59 households.
