= Ligush =

Ligush ليگوش
- Village
- Location within Iran
- Coordinates: 36°21′15″N 51°44′18″E
- Country: Iran
- Province: Mazandaran
- County: Nowshahr
- Bakhsh: Kojur
- Rural District: Tavabe-e Kojur

Population (2006)
  - Total: 79
- Time zone: UTC+3:30 (IRST)

Ligush (Persian: ليگوش, also Romanized as Līgūsh) is a village in Tavabe-e Kojur Rural District, Kojur District, Nowshahr County, Mazandaran Province, Iran. At the 2016 census, its population was 60, in 21 families. Down from 79 in 2006.
