= Kohneh Deh, Nowshahr =

Kohneh Deh كهنه ده
- Village
- Location within Iran
- Coordinates: 36°28′59″N 51°37′17″E
- Country: Iran
- Province: Mazandaran
- County: Nowshahr
- Bakhsh: Kojur
- Rural District: Tavabe-e Kojur

Population (2016)
  - Total: 95
- Time zone: UTC+3:30 (IRST)

Kohneh Deh (Persian: كهنه ده) is a village in Tavabe-e Kojur Rural District, Kojur District, Nowshahr County, Mazandaran Province, Iran. At the 2016 census, its population was 95, in 34 families.
