= Kuhpar =

Kuhpar or Koohpar or Kuh Par (Persian: كوهپر) may refer to:

- Kuh Par
- Kuhpar-e Olya
- Kuhpar-e Sofla
