= Sarivdeh =

Village in Mazandaran province, Iran

Sarivdeh Persian: سريوده
- Village
- Location within Iran
- Coordinates: 36°21′10″N 51°45′05″E
- Country: Iran
- Province: Mazandaran
- County: Nowshahr
- District: Kojur
- Rural District: Tavabe-ye Kojur

Population (2016)
  - Total: 282
- Time zone: UTC+3:30 (IRST)

Sarivdeh (Persian: سريوده) (Note: Also romanized as Sarīvdeh) is a village in Tavabe-ye Kojur Rural District of Kojur District in Nowshahr County, Mazandaran province, Iran.

== Demographics ==
=== Population ===
At the time of the 2006 National Census, the village's population was 255 in 71 households. The following census in 2011 counted 286 people in 89 households. The 2016 census measured the population of the village as 282 people in 111 households.
