= Angil =

Angil انگيل
- Village
- Location within Iran
- Coordinates: 36°20′56″N 51°43′25″E
- Country: Iran
- Province: Mazandaran
- County: Nowshahr
- Bakhsh: Kojur
- Rural District: Tavabe-e Kojur

Population (2006)
  - Total: 140
- Time zone: UTC+3:30 (IRST)

Angil (Persian: انگيل, also Romanized as Āngīl and Angīl) is a village in Tavabe-e Kojur Rural District, Kojur District, Nowshahr County, Mazandaran Province, Iran. At the 2016 census, its population was 130, in 53 families. Down from 140 in 2006.
