= Hezar Som =

Hezar Som هزارسم
- Village
- Location within Iran
- Coordinates: 36°24′37″N 51°24′27″E
- Country: Iran
- Province: Mazandaran
- County: Nowshahr
- Bakhsh: Kojur
- Rural District: Panjak-e Rastaq

Population (2016)
  - Total: 37
- Time zone: UTC+3:30 (IRST)

Hezar Som (Persian: هزارسم, also Romanized as Hezār Som) is a village in Panjak-e Rastaq Rural District, Kojur District, Nowshahr County, Mazandaran Province, Iran. At the 2016 census, its population was 37, in 13 families. Down from 56 people in 2006.
