= Khushal, Mazandaran =

Khushal خوشل
- Village
- Location within Iran
- Coordinates: 36°20′51″N 51°33′05″E
- Country: Iran
- Province: Mazandaran
- County: Nowshahr
- Bakhsh: Kojur
- Rural District: Zanus Rastaq

Population (2016)
  - Total: 168
- Time zone: UTC+3:30 (IRST)

Khushal (Persian: خوشل, also Romanized as Khūshal) is a village in Zanus Rastaq Rural District, Kojur District, Nowshahr County, Mazandaran Province, Iran. At the 2016 census, its population was 168, in 61 families. Increased from 72 people in 2006.
