= Munj, Mazandaran =

Munj مونج
- Village
- Location within Iran
- Coordinates: 36°20′28″N 51°33′22″E
- Country: Iran
- Province: Mazandaran
- County: Nowshahr
- Bakhsh: Kojur
- Rural District: Zanus Rastaq

Population (2016)
  - Total: 76
- Time zone: UTC+3:30 (IRST)

Munj (Persian: مونج, also Romanized as Mūnj) is a village in Zanus Rastaq Rural District, Kojur District, Nowshahr County, Mazandaran Province, Iran. At the 2006 census, its population was 28, in 9 families. Increased to 76 people and 29 households in 2016.
