= Khachak =

Village in Mazandaran province, Iran

Khachak Persian: خاچک
- Village
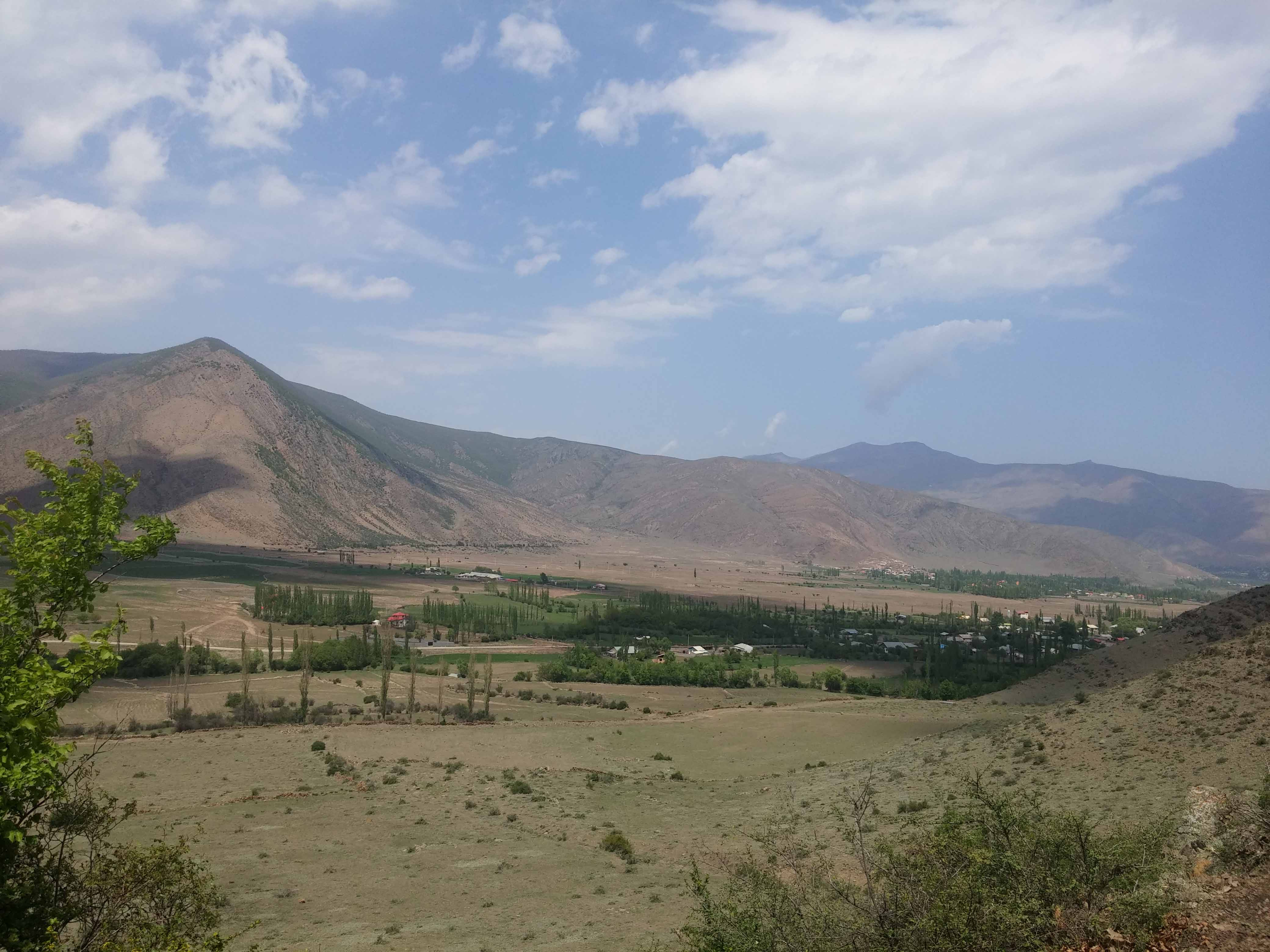

- Location within Iran
- Coordinates: 36°20′10″N 51°44′03″E
- Country: Iran
- Province: Mazandaran
- County: Nowshahr
- District: Kojur
- Rural District: Tavabe-ye Kojur

Population (2016)
  - Total: 211
- Time zone: UTC+3:30 (IRST)

Khachak (Persian: خاچک) (Note: Also romanized as Khāchak and Khāchek) is a village in Tavabe-ye Kojur Rural District of Kojur District in Nowshahr County, Mazandaran province, Iran.

== Demographics ==
=== Population ===
At the time of the 2006 National Census, the village's population was 135 in 35 households. The following census in 2011 counted 233 people in 99 households. The 2016 census measured the population of the village as 211 people in 77 households.
