= Firuzabad, Nowshahr =

Village in Mazandaran province, Iran

Firuzabad Persian: فيروزاباد
- Village
- Location within Iran
- Coordinates: 36°21′24″N 51°21′59″E
- Country: Iran
- Province: Mazandaran
- County: Nowshahr
- District: Kojur
- Rural District: Panjak-e Rastaq

Population (2016)
  - Total: 395
- Time zone: UTC+3:30 (IRST)

Firuzabad (Persian: فيروزاباد) (Note: Also romanized as Fīrūzābād) is a village in Panjak-e Rastaq Rural District of Kojur District in Nowshahr County, Mazandaran province, Iran.

== Demographics ==
=== Population ===
At the time of the 2006 National Census, the village's population was 424 in 119 households. The following census in 2011 counted 292 people in 104 households. The 2016 census measured the population of the village as 395 people in 142 households.
