= Kinch, Iran =

Village in Mazandaran province, Iran

Kinch Persian: كينچ
- Village
- Location within Iran
- Coordinates: 36°23′53″N 51°31′44″E
- Country: Iran
- Province: Mazandaran
- County: Nowshahr
- District: Kojur
- Rural District: Zanus Rastaq

Population (2016)
  - Total: 681
- Time zone: UTC+3:30 (IRST)

Kinch (Persian: كينچ) (Note: Also romanized as Kīnch; also known as Kinj (كينج), also romanized as Kīnj) is a village in Zanus Rastaq Rural District of Kojur District in Nowshahr County, Mazandaran province, Iran.

== Demographics ==
=== Population ===
At the time of the 2006 National Census, the village's population was 537 in 170 households. The following census in 2011 counted 700 people in 228 households. The 2016 census measured the population of the village as 681 people in 288 households.
