= Nires =

Village in Mazandaran province, Iran

Nires Persian: نيرس
- Village
- Location within Iran
- Coordinates: 36°26′22″N 51°20′53″E
- Country: Iran
- Province: Mazandaran
- County: Nowshahr
- District: Kojur
- Rural District: Panjak-e Rastaq

Population (2016)
  - Total: 400
- Time zone: UTC+3:30 (IRST)

Nires (Persian: نيرس) (Note: Also romanized as Nīres) is a village in Panjak-e Rastaq Rural District of Kojur District in Nowshahr County, Mazandaran province, Iran.

== Demographics ==
=== Population ===
At the time of the 2006 National Census, the village's population was 318 in 71 households. The following census in 2011 counted 226 people in 65 households. The 2016 census measured the population of the village as 400 people in 135 households.
