= Sama, Nowshahr =

Village in Mazandaran province, Iran

Sama Persian: سمائ
- Village
- Location within Iran
- Coordinates: 36°22′42″N 51°23′33″E
- Country: Iran
- Province: Mazandaran
- County: Nowshahr
- District: Kojur
- Rural District: Panjak-e Rastaq

Population (2016)
  - Total: 448
- Time zone: UTC+3:30 (IRST)

Sama (Persian: سمائ) (Note: Also romanized as Samā’) is a village in Panjak-e Rastaq Rural District of Kojur District in Nowshahr County, Mazandaran province, Iran.

== Demographics ==
=== Population ===
At the time of the 2006 National Census, the village's population was 418 in 114 households. The following census in 2011 counted 380 people in 117 households. The 2016 census measured the population of the village as 448 people in 153 households.
