= Do Ab-e Kojur =

Do Ab-e Kojur دواب كجور
- Village
- Location within Iran
- Coordinates: 36°29′38″N 51°20′12″E
- Country: Iran
- Province: Mazandaran
- County: Nowshahr
- Bakhsh: Kojur
- Rural District: Panjak-e Rastaq

Population (2016)
  - Total: 108
- Time zone: UTC+3:30 (IRST)

Do Ab-e Kojur (Persian: دواب كجور, also Romanized as Do Āb-e Kojūr; also known as Do Āb) is a village in Panjak-e Rastaq Rural District, Kojur District, Nowshahr County, Mazandaran Province, Iran. At the 2016 census, its population was 108, in 40 families. Increased from 67 people in 2006.
