= Avil =

Avil اويل
- Village
- Location within Iran
- Coordinates: 36°25′21″N 51°39′00″E
- Country: Iran
- Province: Mazandaran
- County: Nowshahr
- Bakhsh: Kojur
- Rural District: Zanus Rastaq

Population (2016)
  - Total: 148
- Time zone: UTC+3:30 (IRST)

Avil (Persian: اويل, also Romanized as Avīl) is a village in Zanus Rastaq Rural District, Kojur District, Nowshahr County, Mazandaran Province, Iran. At the 2016 census, its population was 148, in 58 families. Increased from 92 people in 2006.
