= Churan, Mazandaran =

Churan چورن
- Village
- Location within Iran
- Coordinates: 36°24′02″N 51°41′34″E
- Country: Iran
- Province: Mazandaran
- County: Nowshahr
- Bakhsh: Kojur
- Rural District: Zanus Rastaq

Population (2016)
  - Total: 242
- Time zone: UTC+3:30 (IRST)

Churan (Persian: چورن, also Romanized as Chūran) is a village in Zanus Rastaq Rural District, Kojur District, Nowshahr County, Mazandaran Province, Iran. At the 2016 census, its population was 242, in 76 families. Up from 227 in 2006.
