= Veysar, Mazandaran =

Veysar ويسر
- Village
- Location within Iran
- Coordinates: 36°27′41″N 51°32′34″E
- Country: Iran
- Province: Mazandaran
- County: Nowshahr
- Bakhsh: Kojur
- Rural District: Zanus Rastaq

Population (2016)
  - Total: 142
- Time zone: UTC+3:30 (IRST)

Veysar (Persian: ويسر) is a village in Zanus Rastaq Rural District, Kojur District, Nowshahr County, Mazandaran Province, Iran. At the 2016 census, its population was 142, in 55 families. Increased from 51 people in 2006.
