= Gat-e Kash =

Gat-e Kash گتكش
- Village
- Location within Iran
- Coordinates: 36°25′28″N 51°32′27″E
- Country: Iran
- Province: Mazandaran
- County: Nowshahr
- Bakhsh: Kojur
- Rural District: Zanus Rastaq

Population (2016)
  - Total: 174
- Time zone: UTC+3:30 (IRST)

Gat-e Kash (Persian: گتكش; also known as Gatehkash and Kateh Kash) is a village in Zanus Rastaq Rural District, Kojur District, Nowshahr County, Mazandaran Province, Iran. At the 2016 census, its population was 174, in 60 families.
