= Ali Darreh =

Ali Darreh عاليدره
- Village
- Location within Iran
- Coordinates: 36°27′17″N 51°28′59″E
- Country: Iran
- Province: Mazandaran
- County: Nowshahr
- Bakhsh: Kojur
- Rural District: Panjak-e Rastaq

Population (2016)
  - Total: 211
- Time zone: UTC+3:30 (IRST)

Ali Darreh (Persian: عاليدره, also Romanized as ‘Ālī Darreh; also known as Āl Darreh) is a village in Panjak-e Rastaq Rural District, Kojur District, Nowshahr County, Mazandaran Province, Iran. At the 2016 census, its population was 211, in 78 families. Down from 287 people in 2006.
