= Kikuh, Mazandaran =

Kikuh كي كوه
- Village
- Location within Iran
- Coordinates: 36°20′11″N 51°23′48″E
- Country: Iran
- Province: Mazandaran
- County: Nowshahr
- Bakhsh: Kojur
- Rural District: Panjak-e Rastaq

Population (2016)
  - Total: 124
- Time zone: UTC+3:30 (IRST)

Kikuh (Persian: كي كوه, also Romanized as Kīkūh; also known as Kīkū) is a village in Panjak-e Rastaq Rural District, Kojur District, Nowshahr County, Mazandaran Province, Iran. At the 2016 census, its population was 124, in 42 families. Up from 106 in 2006.
