= Chenar Bon, Nowshahr =

Village in Mazandaran province, Iran

Chenar Bon Persian: چناربن
- Village
- Location within Iran
- Coordinates: 36°23′33″N 51°40′30″E
- Country: Iran
- Province: Mazandaran
- County: Nowshahr
- District: Kojur
- Rural District: Zanus Rastaq

Population (2016)
  - Total: 381
- Time zone: UTC+3:30 (IRST)

Chenar Bon (Persian: چناربن) (Note: Also romanized as Chenār Bon) is a village in Zanus Rastaq Rural District of Kojur District in Nowshahr County, Mazandaran province, Iran.

== Demographics ==
=== Population ===
At the time of the 2006 National Census, the village's population was 244 in 50 households. The following census in 2011 counted 263 people in 84 households. The 2016 census measured the population of the village as 381 people in 109 households.
