= Eslamabad, Nowshahr =

Village in Mazandaran province, Iran

Eslamabad Persian: اسلام آباد
- Village
- Location within Iran
- Coordinates: 36°21′58″N 51°30′41″E
- Country: Iran
- Province: Mazandaran
- County: Nowshahr
- District: Kojur
- Rural District: Zanus Rastaq

Population (2016)
  - Total: 385
- Time zone: UTC+3:30 (IRST)

Eslamabad (Persian: اسلام آباد) (Note: Also romanized as Eslāmābād; also known as Sās) is a village in Zanus Rastaq Rural District of Kojur District in Nowshahr County, Mazandaran province, Iran.

== Demographics ==
=== Population ===
At the time of the 2006 National Census, the village's population was 274 in 101 households. The following census in 2011 counted 209 people in 81 households. The 2016 census measured the population of the village as 385 people in 145 households.
