= Keya Kola, Nowshahr =

Keya Kola كياكلا
- Village
- Location within Iran
- Coordinates: 36°22′04″N 51°33′03″E
- Country: Iran
- Province: Mazandaran
- County: Nowshahr
- Bakhsh: Kojur
- Rural District: Zanus Rastaq

Population (2016)
  - Total: 147
- Time zone: UTC+3:30 (IRST)

Keya Kola (Persian: كياكلا, also Romanized as Keyā Kolā) is a village in Zanus Rastaq Rural District, Kojur District, Nowshahr County, Mazandaran Province, Iran. At the 2016 census, its population was 147, in 55 families. Increased from 65 people in 2006.
