= Largan, Nowshahr =

Largan لرگان
- Village
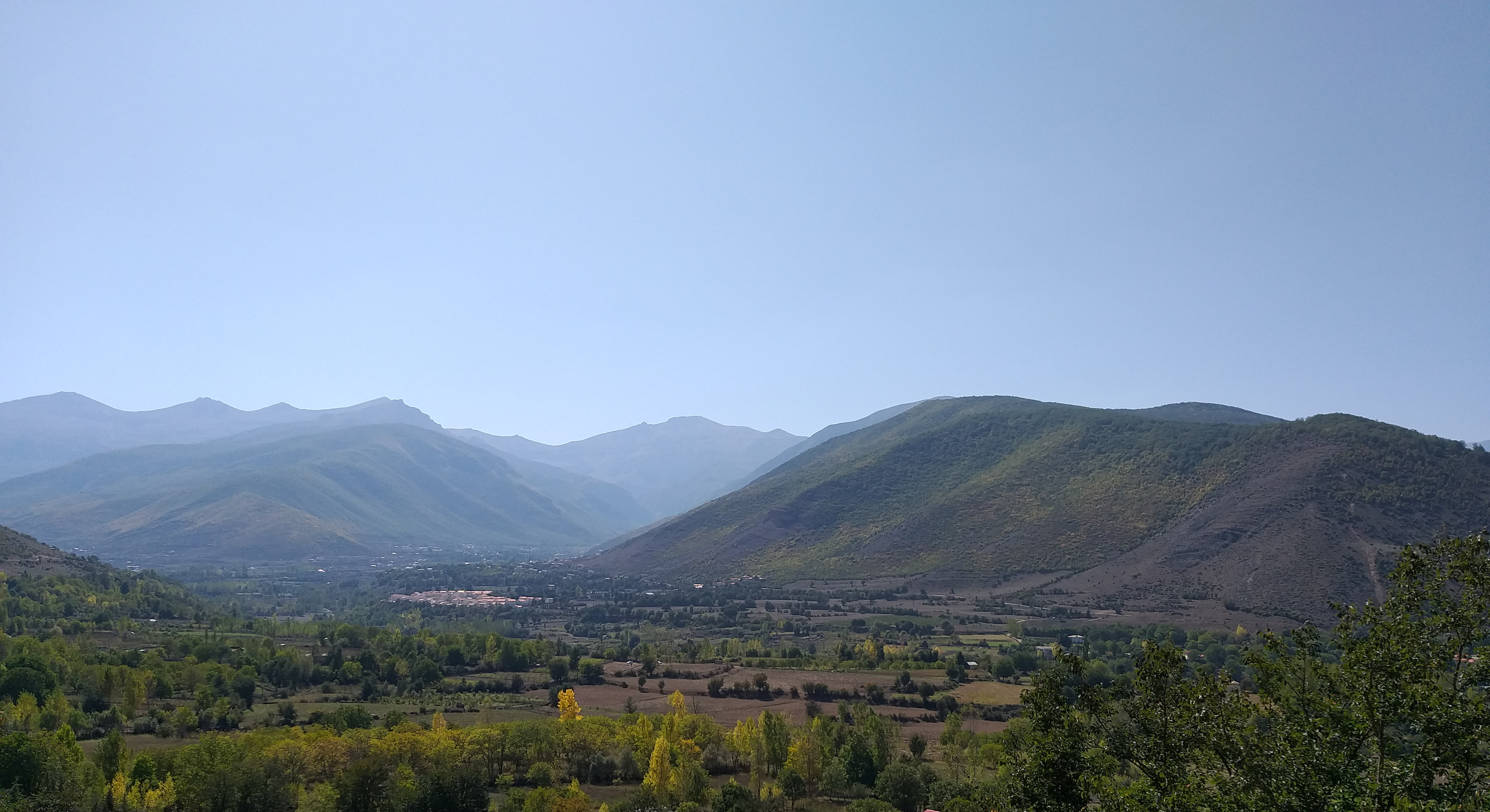

- Location within Iran
- Coordinates: 36°21′54″N 51°34′02″E
- Country: Iran
- Province: Mazandaran
- County: Nowshahr
- Bakhsh: Kojur
- Rural District: Zanus Rastaq

Population (2016)
  - Total: 200
- Time zone: UTC+3:30 (IRST)

Largan (Persian: لرگان, also Romanized as Largān) is a village in Zanus Rastaq Rural District, Kojur District, Nowshahr County, Mazandaran Province, Iran. At the 2006 census, its population was 215, in 73 families. Down to 200 people and 71 households in 2016.
