= Kandolus =

Village in Mazandaran province, Iran

Kandelous Persian: كندلوس
- Village
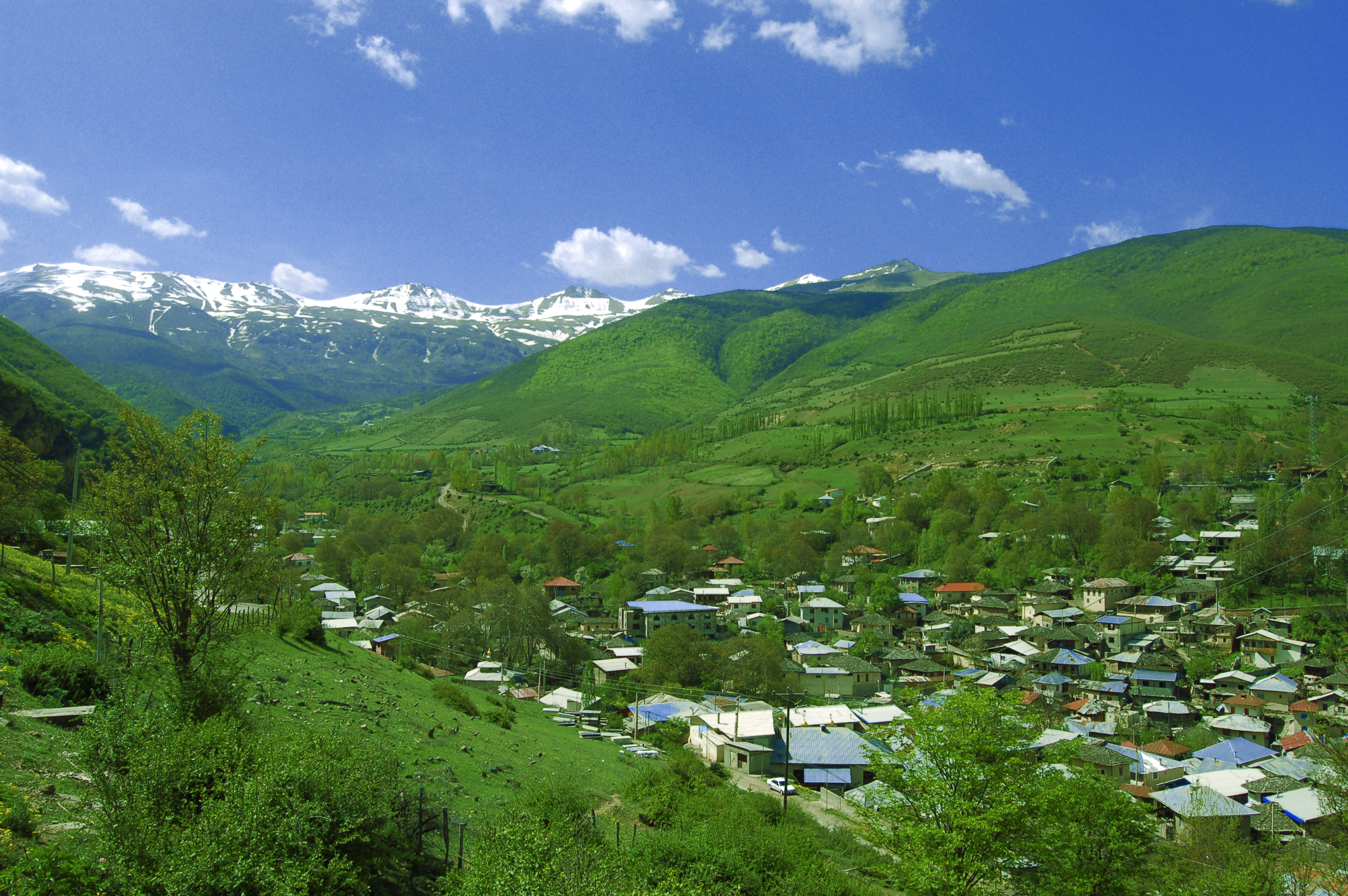
- The village of Kandelous

- Location within Iran
- Coordinates: 36°19′27″N 51°34′02″E
- Country: Iran
- Province: Mazandaran
- County: Nowshahr
- District: Kojur
- Rural District: Zanus Rastaq

Population (2016)
  - Total: 1,092
- Time zone: UTC+3:30 (IRST)

Kandelous (Persian: كندلوس) (Note: Also romanized as Kandelous, Kandelūs, Kandloos, Kandlūs, and Kandolūs; also known as Gendulas) is a village in Zanus Rastaq Rural District of Kojur District in Nowshahr County, Mazandaran province, Iran. It is in the Alborz mountain range along the Zanus Valley in the north of Iran.

== History ==
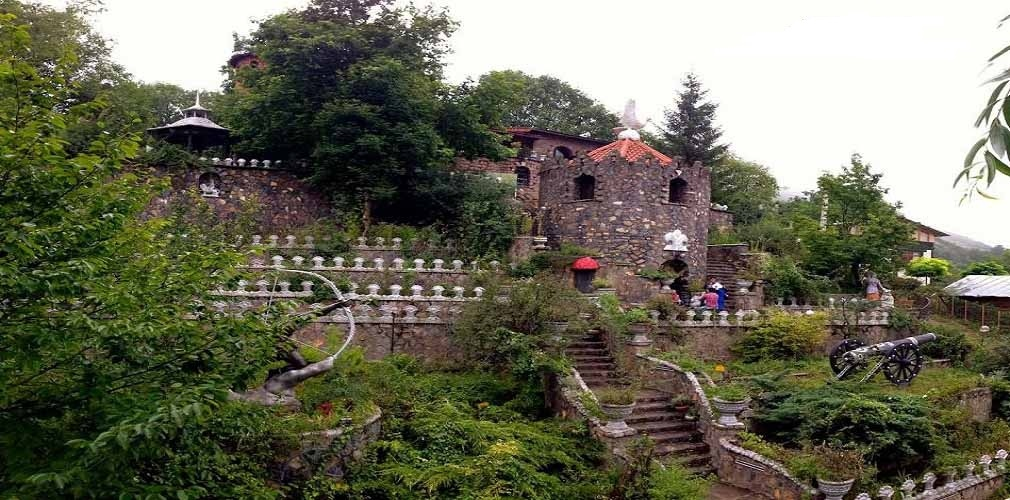
Anthropology Museum

Kandelous is recognized as one of the oldest human settlements in the Mazandaran province. The village also has a Qajar era bathhouse. The Museum of Anthropology, abundant waterfalls, the Museum of Medicinal Plants, the old bathhouse, and handicrafts and souvenirs are among the other attractions that have caused this village to be nominated for registration on UNESCO’s World Heritage List.

== Demographics ==
=== Population ===
At the time of the 2006 National Census, the village had a population of 115 individuals in 45 households. There were 915 people in 273 households in the following 2011 census. The 2016 census recorded a population of 1,092 residents in 378 households, the most populous in its rural district.

== Museums ==
The Kandelous Anthropology Museum is one of the non-governmental museums of Mazandaran province, established between 1981 and 1988. The museum is the result of the efforts of Dr. Ali Asghar Jahangiri, a resident of the village who spent his childhood in Kandelous

It houses a diverse collection of artifacts such as agricultural tools, paintings, pottery, and utensils dating from the second millennium BCE to the Qajar period. Additionally, the museum preserves written materials, such as manuscripts, books, copies of the Qur'an, poetry collections, marriage contracts, and various official decrees.

Founded in 1986 by the Kandelous Agricultural Complex, the Museum of Medicinal Plants (also known as the Botanical Garden) was established in order to cultivate, breed, produce, and package medicinal and aromatic plants and extract plant essences and oils.

== Global recognition ==
In 2023, Mehdi Bahvarand, an official from the Ministry of Cultural Heritage, Tourism, and Handicrafts, announced that Kandelous was nominated as one of the eight Iranian villages being considered for the title of Global Village, awarded by the World Tourism Organization (UNWTO). This recognition highlights a village's cultural and historical value.

Mohammad Valipour, head of the Cultural Heritage, Handicrafts, and Tourism Department of Nowshahr, has confirmed that the village's dossier has been submitted to the UNESCO World Heritage site.

== See also ==
- Chalus
