= Lashkenar, Nowshahr =

Lashkenar لشكنار
- Village
- Location within Iran
- Coordinates: 36°28′28″N 51°28′20″E
- Country: Iran
- Province: Mazandaran
- County: Nowshahr
- Bakhsh: Kojur
- Rural District: Panjak-e Rastaq

Population (2016)
  - Total: 203
- Time zone: UTC+3:30 (IRST)

Lashkenar (Persian: لشكنار, also Romanized as Lashkenār) is a village in Panjak-e Rastaq Rural District, Kojur District, Nowshahr County, Mazandaran Province, Iran. At the 2016 census, its population was 203, in 72 families. Increased from 84 people in 2006.
