= Malik Kayumarth Castle =

Castle in Mazandaran Province, Iran

Malik Kayumarth castle
- قلعه ملک کیومرث

General information
- Type: Castle
- Location: Nowshahr County, Iran

Malik Kayumarth castle (Persian: قلعه ملک کیومرث) is a historical castle located in Nowshahr County in Mazandaran Province, The longevity of this fortress dates back to the Historical periods after Islam.
