= Kuhpar-e Sofla =

Kuhpar-e Sofla كوهپر سفلی
- Village
- Location within Iran
- Coordinates: 36°25′27″N 51°36′24″E
- Country: Iran
- Province: Mazandaran
- County: Nowshahr
- Bakhsh: Kojur
- Rural District: Zanus Rastaq

Population (2016)
  - Total: 221
- Time zone: UTC+3:30 (IRST)

Kuhpar-e Sofla (Persian: كوهپر سفلی, also Romanized as Kūhpar-e Soflá; also known as Koohpar, Kūhpar, Kūhpar-e Pā’īn, and Kūh Par Pā’īn) is a village in Zanus Rastaq Rural District, Kojur District, Nowshahr County, Mazandaran Province, Iran. At the 2006 census, its population was 277, in 85 families. Down to 221 people and 76 households in 2016.
