= Kangar (disambiguation) =

Kangar is the state capital and the largest town in Perlis, Malaysia.

Kangar may also refer to:

- Kangar, Iran
- Kangar (federal constituency), represented in the Dewan Rakyat
- Bandar Kangar (state constituency), formerly represented in the Perlis State Legislative Assembly (1959–1986) (see List of Malaysian State Assembly Representatives (1982–1986))
- Kangar (state constituency), formerly represented in the Perlis State Council (1955–1959) (see List of Malayan State and Settlement Council Representatives (1954–1959))

== See also ==
- Kangly, ancient Turkic tribe
- Kangju, largest ancient Central Asian state
