= Kuhpar-e Olya =

Kuhpar-e Olya كوهپرعليا
- Village
- Location within Iran
- Coordinates: 36°25′14″N 51°36′59″E
- Country: Iran
- Province: Mazandaran
- County: Nowshahr
- Bakhsh: Kojur
- Rural District: Zanus Rastaq

Population (2016)
  - Total: 188
- Time zone: UTC+3:30 (IRST)

Kuhpar-e Olya (Persian: كوهپرعليا, also Romanized as Kūhpar-e ‘Olyā; also known as Kūhpar-e Bālā) is a village in Zanus Rastaq Rural District, Kojur District, Nowshahr County, Mazandaran Province, Iran. At the 2016 census, its population was 188, in 62 families. Increased from 100 people in 2006.
