= Kenis =

Kenis كنيس
- Village
- Location within Iran
- Coordinates: 36°28′31″N 51°23′59″E
- Country: Iran
- Province: Mazandaran
- County: Nowshahr
- Bakhsh: Kojur
- Rural District: Panjak-e Rastaq

Population (2016)
  - Total: 231
- Time zone: UTC+3:30 (IRST)

Kenis (Persian: كنيس, also Romanized as Kenīs; also known as Kenīs Darreh and Kīnes) is a village in Panjak-e Rastaq Rural District, Kojur District, Nowshahr County, Mazandaran Province, Iran. At the 2006 census, its population was 249, in 58 families. Down to 231 (up to 71 households), in 2016.
