= Keni =

Keni may refer to:

== Geography and language ==
- Kenis (Persian: كنيس) a village in Panjak-e Rastaq Rural District, Iran
- Rombo language (redirect from Keni dialect)
- Central Kilimanjaro language (redirect from Keni language), a Bantu language of Tanzania spoken by the Chaga people

== Film and TV ==
- KENI AM 650, a radio station in Anchorage, Alaska
  - KENI Radio Building Art Moderne building in Anchorage, Alaska
- Keni (film) a 1982 Indian Malayalam film, directed by J. Sasikumar
- Keni or Kinar (film), a 2018 Indian film, directed by M. A. Nishad

== People ==
- Keni Styles, a British former pornographic actor of Thai origin
- Keni Liptzin (1863–1916), actress in the early years of Yiddish theater
- Keni Burke (1953), American singer
- Jenny Keni (1982), a sprinter from the Solomon Islands
- Keni Doidoi (1976), an association football player from Fiji
- Keni Thomas, American country music singer
- Paul Kenis (1885–1934), Flemish writer
- Keni Dakuidreketi, Fijian politician
