= Gil Kola, Nowshahr =

Gil Kola گيل كلا
- Village
- Location within Iran
- Coordinates: 36°19′49″N 51°34′02″E
- Country: Iran
- Province: Mazandaran
- County: Nowshahr
- Bakhsh: Kojur
- Rural District: Zanus Rastaq

Population (2016)
  - Total: 171
- Time zone: UTC+3:30 (IRST)

Gil Kola (Persian: گيل كلا, also Romanized as Gīl Kolā and Gīl Kalā; also known as Gīl Kalā-ye Zānūsrestāq, Gīl Kolā-ye Zānū Sar Tāq, Gīl Kolā-ye Zānūs Rostāq, and Gil Kola Zanoos Rastagh) is a village in Zanus Rastaq Rural District, Kojur District, Nowshahr County, Mazandaran Province, Iran. At the 2016 census, its population was 171, in 62 families.
