= Kangar, Iran =

Kangar كنگر
- Village
- Location within Iran
- Coordinates: 36°18′21″N 51°43′59″E
- Country: Iran
- Province: Mazandaran
- County: Nowshahr
- Bakhsh: Kojur
- Rural District: Tavabe-e Kojur

Population (2016)
  - Total: 34
- Time zone: UTC+3:30 (IRST)

Kangar (Persian: كنگر) is a village in Tavabe-e Kojur Rural District, Kojur District, Nowshahr County, Mazandaran Province, Iran. At the 2016 census, its population was 34, in 14 families.
