= Manjir, Mazandaran =

Village in Mazandaran province, Iran

Manjir Persian: منجير
- Village
- Location within Iran
- Coordinates: 36°21′25″N 51°24′14″E
- Country: Iran
- Province: Mazandaran
- County: Nowshahr
- District: Kojur
- Rural District: Panjak-e Rastaq

Population (2016)
  - Total: 475
- Time zone: UTC+3:30 (IRST)

Manjir (Persian: منجير) (Note: Also romanized as Manjīr) is a village in Panjak-e Rastaq Rural District of Kojur District in Nowshahr County, Mazandaran province, Iran.

== Demographics ==
=== Population ===
At the time of the 2006 National Census, the village's population was 271 in 72 households. The following census in 2011 counted 276 people in 97 households. The 2016 census measured the population of the village as 475 people in 165 households.
