= Gil Kola =

Gil Kola or Gil Kala or Gilkala (Persian: گيل كلا) may refer to:

- Gil Kola, Chalus
- Gil Kola, Nowshahr
