= Kiakola (disambiguation) =

Kiakola is a city in Simorgh County, Mazandaran Province, Iran.

Kiakola or Kia Kola or Kiya Kola or Keya Kola or Kia Kala or Kiya Kala (Persian: كياكلا) may also refer to various places in Iran:

- Kia Kola, Chalus
- Keya Kola, Nowshahr
- Kia Kola, Nur
- Kia Kola, Sari
- Kiakola District, former district in Simorgh County
- Kiakola Rural District, rural district in Simorgh County
