= Barkan, Nowshahr =

Barkan بركن
- Village
- Location within Iran
- Coordinates: 36°28′07″N 51°40′44″E
- Country: Iran
- Province: Mazandaran
- County: Nowshahr
- Bakhsh: Kojur
- Rural District: Tavabe-e Kojur

Population (2016)
  - Total: 56
- Time zone: UTC+3:30 (IRST)

Barkan (Persian: بركن) is a village in Tavabe-e Kojur Rural District, Kojur District, Nowshahr County, Mazandaran Province, Iran. At the 2016 census, its population was 56, in 20 families. Up from 19 in 2006.
