= Tavabe-ye Kojur Rural District =

Rural district in Mazandaran province, Iran

Tavabe-ye Kojur Rural District Persian: دهستان توابع كجور
- Rural District
- Location within Iran
- Coordinates: 36°24′N 51°43′E
- Country: Iran
- Province: Mazandaran
- County: Nowshahr
- District: Kojur
- Established: 1987
- Capital: Kojur

Population (2016)
  - Total: 3,068
- Time zone: UTC+3:30 (IRST)

Tavabe-ye Kojur Rural District (Persian: دهستان توابع كجور) is in Kojur District of Nowshahr County, Mazandaran province, Iran. It is administered from the city of Kojur.

== Demographics ==
=== Population ===
At the time of the 2006 National Census, the rural district's population was 4,851 in 1,347 households. There were 6,360 inhabitants in 2,061 households at the following census of 2011. The 2016 census measured the population of the rural district as 3,068 in 1,131 households. The most populous of its 23 villages was Firuz Kola-ye Sofla, with 447 people.

=== Other villages in the rural district ===
- Angas
- Angil
- Barkan
- Bin
- Chamar Kuh
- Firuz Kola-ye Olya
- Hezar Khal
- Kalik
- Kangar
- Khachak
- Kodir
- Kohneh Deh
- Ligush
- Neytal
- Pi Chelow
- Salehan
- Sarivdeh
- Shah Najer
- Vashkan
