= Panjak-e Rastaq Rural District =

Rural district in Mazandaran province, Iran

Panjak-e Rastaq Rural District Persian: دهستان پنجك رستاق
- Rural District
- Location within Iran
- Coordinates: 36°23′N 51°25′E
- Country: Iran
- Province: Mazandaran
- County: Nowshahr
- District: Kojur
- Established: 1987
- Capital: Dasht-e Nazir

Population (2016)
  - Total: 4,577
- Time zone: UTC+3:30 (IRST)

Panjak-e Rastaq Rural District (Persian: دهستان پنجك رستاق) is in Kojur District of Nowshahr County, Mazandaran province, Iran. Its capital is the village of Dasht-e Nazir.

== Demographics ==
=== Population ===
At the time of the 2006 National Census, the rural district's population was 4,437 in 1,155 households. There were 4,151 inhabitants in 1,318 households at the following census of 2011. The 2016 census measured the population of the rural district as 4,577 in 1,604 households. The most populous of its 25 villages was Chetan, with 511 people.

=== Other villages in the rural district ===
- Ali Darreh
- Bastam
- Do Ab-e Kojur
- Firuzabad
- Hasanabad
- Heyrat
- Hezar Som
- Kandis Kola
- Kandusar
- Kenis
- Khvorshidabad
- Kikuh
- Lal-e Tazehabad
- Lashkenar
- Manjir
- Naserabad
- Nires
- Pol-e Zoghal
- Sama
- Sarus
