= Kojur =

City in Mazandaran province, Iran

Kojur Persian: کجور
- City
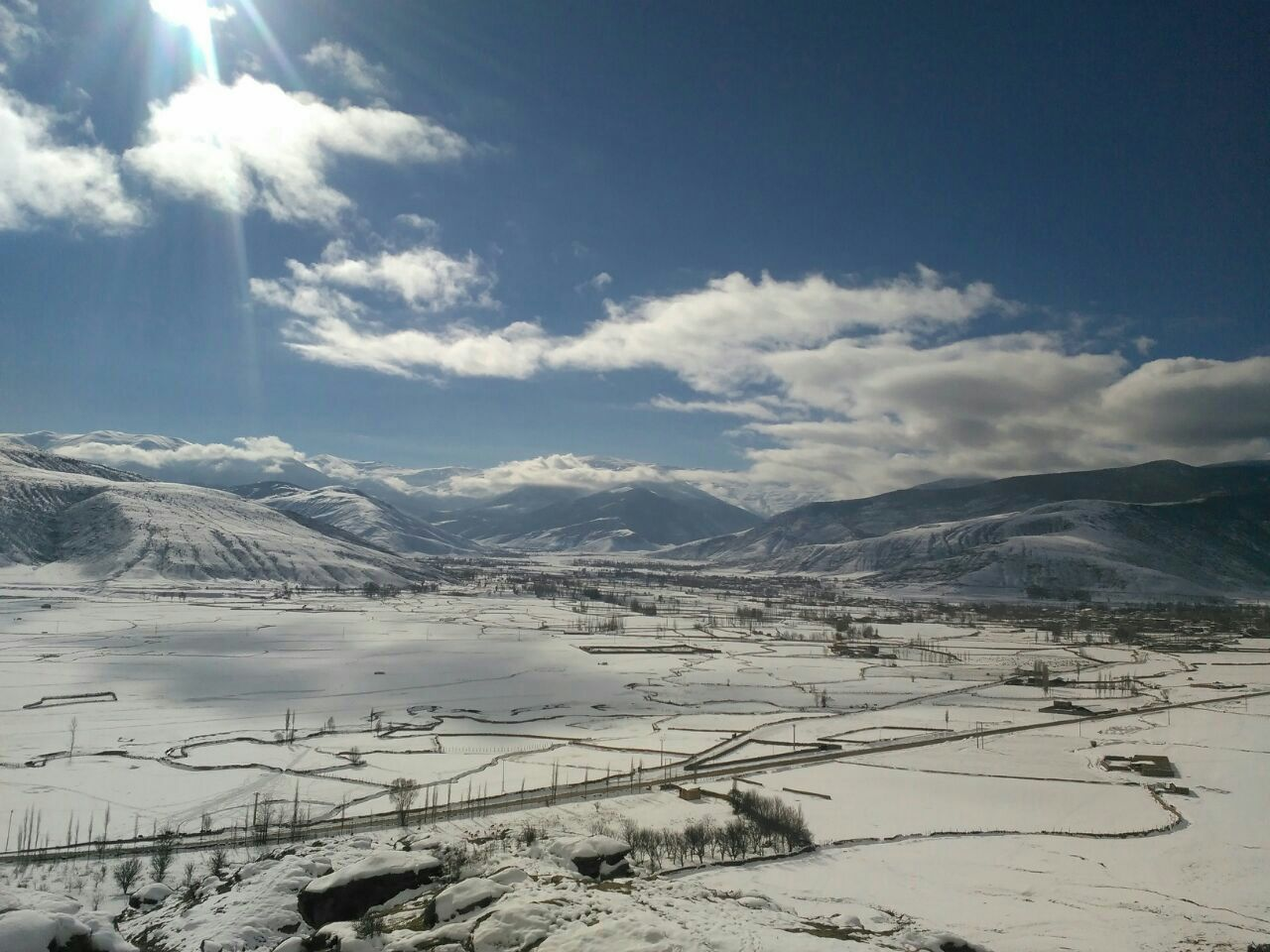
- The city of Kojur

- Location within Iran
- Coordinates: 36°23′05″N 51°43′37″E
- Country: Iran
- Province: Mazandaran
- County: Nowshahr
- District: Kojur
- Established as a city: 2012

Population (2016)
  - Total: 3,120
- Time zone: UTC+3:30 (IRST)

Kojur (Persian: کجور) (Note: Also known as Baladeh-ye Kujūr, Dehe Kujūr, Kujur, and Kujūr) is a city in Kojur District of Nowshahr County, Mazandaran province, Iran, serving as the administrative center for Tavabe-ye Kojur Rural District. Kojur was founded by the Paduspanid ruler Eskandar II.

== Demographics ==
=== Population ===
At the time of the 2006 National Census, Kojur's population was 2,215 in 570 households, when it was a village in Tavabe-ye Kojur Rural District. The following census in 2011 counted 3,328 people in 1,017 households. The 2016 census measured the population as 3,120 people in 1,052 households, by which time the village of Kojur had been converted to a city.

== See also ==
- Kojur River
