= Pul, Iran =

City in Mazandaran province, Iran

Pul Persian: پول
- City
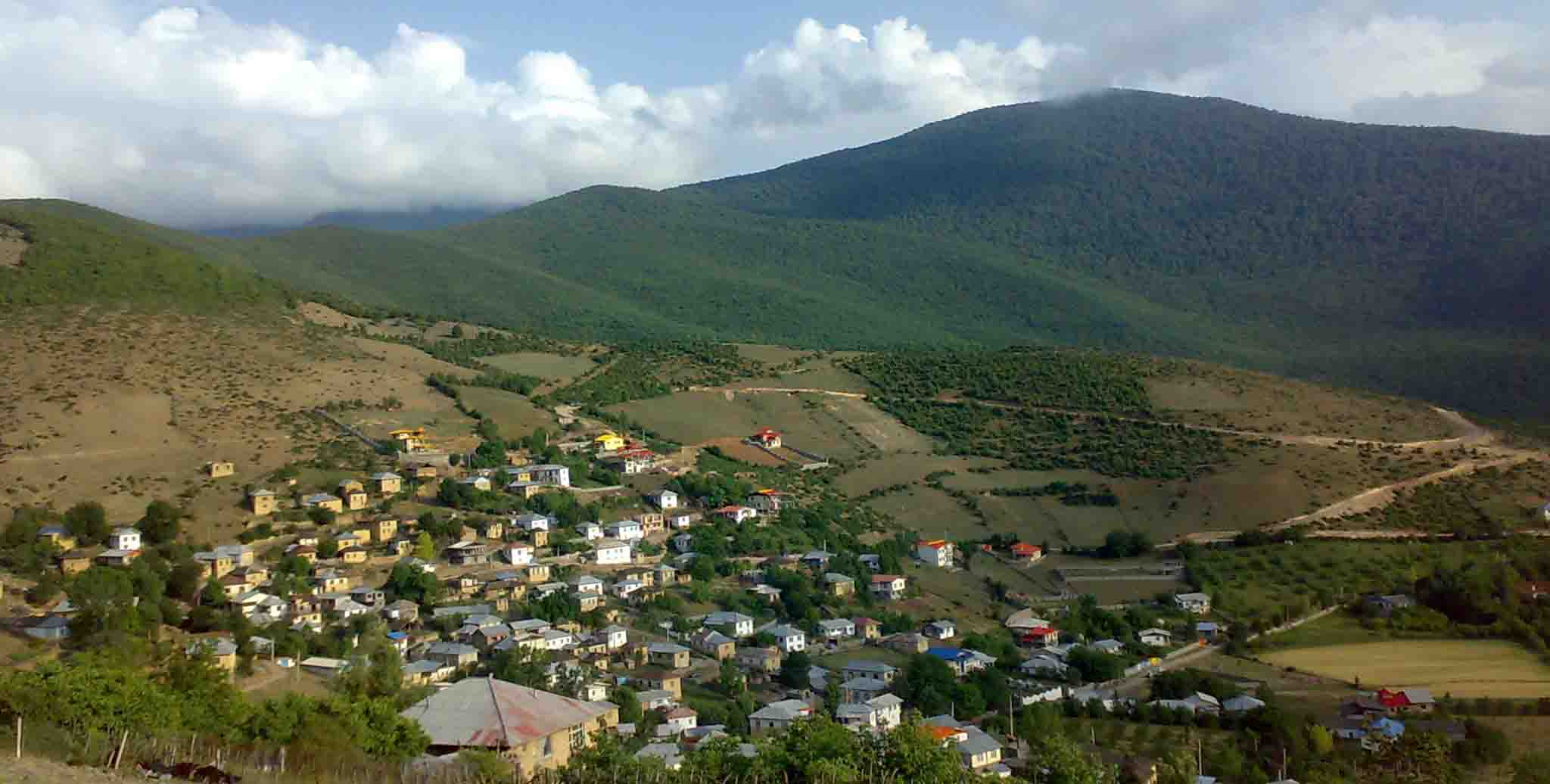
- The city of Pul

- Location within Iran
- Coordinates: 36°23′44″N 51°35′37″E
- Country: Iran
- Province: Mazandaran
- County: Nowshahr
- District: Kojur
- Established as a city: 2010

Population (2016)
  - Total: 3,150
- Time zone: UTC+3:30 (IRST)

Pul (Persian: پول) (Note: Also romanized as Pūl) is a city in, and the capital of, Kojur District in Nowshahr County, Mazandaran province, Iran. It also serves as the administrative center for Zanus Rastaq Rural District.

== Demographics ==
=== Population ===
At the time of the 2006 National Census, Pul's population was 1,204 in 330 households, when it was a village in Zanus Rastaq Rural District. The following census in 2011 counted 2,806 people in 741 households, by which time the village had been converted to a city. The 2016 census measured the population of the city as 3,150 people in 1,064 households.
