= Zanus Rastaq Rural District =

Rural district in Mazandaran province, Iran

Zanus Rastaq Rural District Persian: دهستان زانوس رستاق
- Rural District
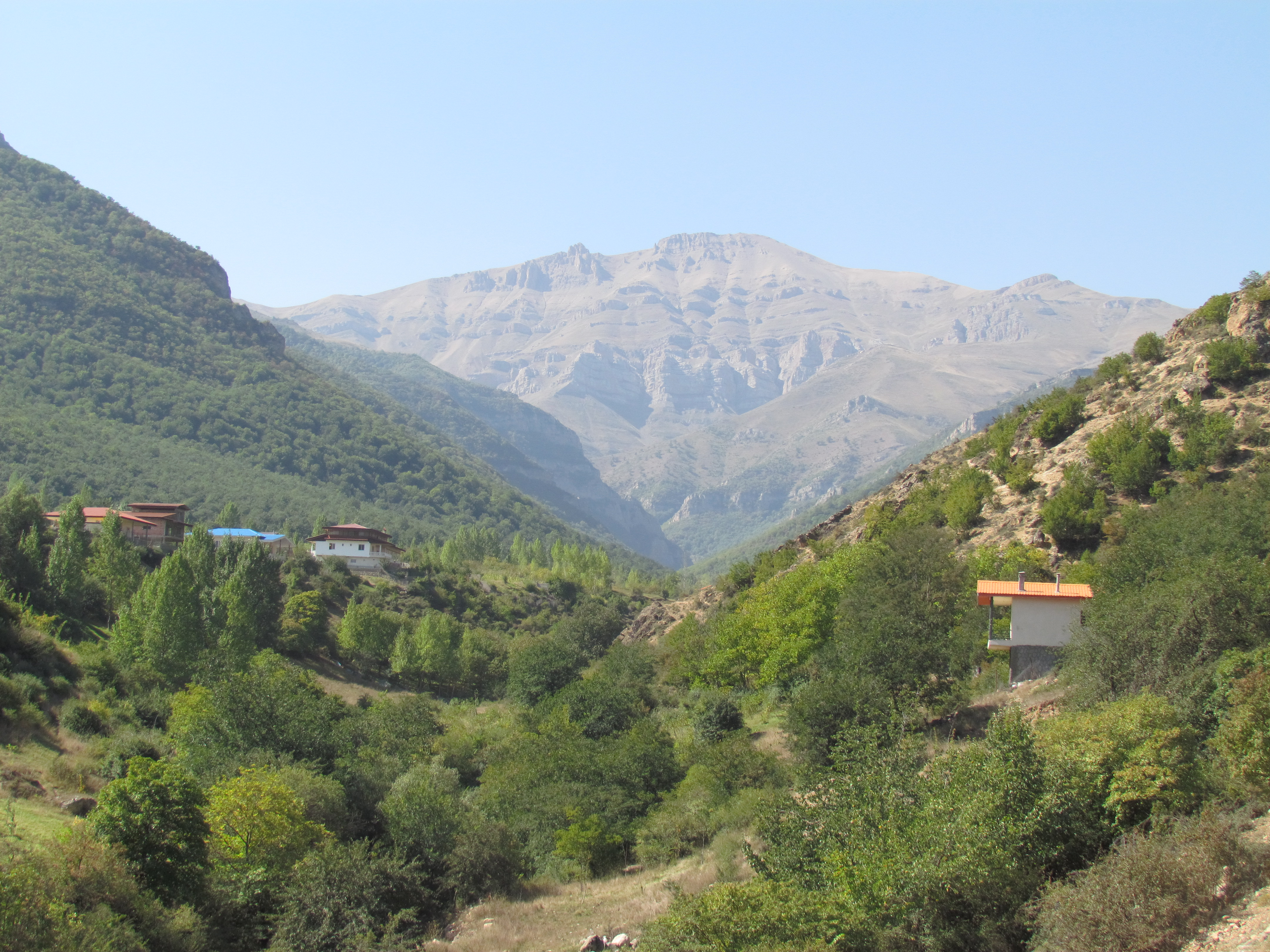

- Location within Iran
- Coordinates: 36°22′N 51°36′E
- Country: Iran
- Province: Mazandaran
- County: Nowshahr
- District: Kojur
- Established: 1987
- Capital: Pul

Population (2016)
  - Total: 6,982
- Time zone: UTC+3:30 (IRST)

Zanus Rastaq Rural District (Persian: دهستان زانوس رستاق) is in Kojur District of Nowshahr County, Mazandaran province, Iran. It is administered from the city of Pul.

== Demographics ==
=== Population ===
At the time of the 2006 National Census, the rural district's population was 4,915 in 1,526 households. There were 6,354 inhabitants in 2,130 households at the following census of 2011. The 2016 census measured the population of the rural district as 6,982 in 2,476 households. The most populous of its 26 villages was Kandolus, with 1,092 people.

=== Other villages in the rural district ===
- Astan-e Karud
- Avil
- Chenar Bon
- Churan
- Dalasam
- Eslamabad
- Gat-e Kash
- Gil Kola
- Kashkak
- Keya Kola
- Khushal
- Kinch
- Kuhpar-e Olya
- Kuhpar-e Sofla
- Largan
- Lashak
- Mir Kola
- Munj
- Nichkuh
- Nimvar
- Pey Deh
- Veysar
- Zanus
