= Firuz Kola-ye Sofla, Nowshahr =

Village in Mazandaran province, Iran

Firuz Kola-ye Sofla Persian: فيروزكلا سفلی
- Village
- Location within Iran
- Coordinates: 36°22′49″N 51°46′54″E
- Country: Iran
- Province: Mazandaran
- County: Nowshahr
- District: Kojur
- Rural District: Tavabe-ye Kojur

Population (2016)
  - Total: 447
- Time zone: UTC+3:30 (IRST)

Firuz Kola-ye Sofla (Persian: فيروزكلاسفلی) (Note: Also romanized as Fīrūz Kolā-ye Soflá; also known as Fīrūz Kolā-ye Pā’īn) is a village in Tavabe-ye Kojur Rural District of Kojur District in Nowshahr County, Mazandaran province, Iran.

== Demographics ==
=== Population ===
At the time of the 2006 National Census, the village's population was 283 in 84 households. The following census in 2011 counted 237 people in 75 households. The 2016 census measured the population of the village as 447 people in 153 households, the most populous in its rural district.
