= Barkhan (disambiguation) =

Barkhan is a city in Pakistan.

Barkhan may also refer to:

- Barkhan District in Pakistan
- Barkhan Tehsil, a subdivision of Barkhan district
- Barkhan, Uttar Pradesh, a village in India

== See also ==
- Barchan, a type of sand dune
- Barchan, a phase in the formation of Zastrugi (ridges on a snow surface)
