= Salehan, Kohgiluyeh and Boyer-Ahmad =

Salehan صالحان
- Village
- Location within Iran
- Coordinates: 30°48′49″N 51°19′55″E
- Country: Iran
- Province: Kohgiluyeh and Boyer-Ahmad
- County: Dana
- Bakhsh: Kabgian
- Rural District: Kabgian

Population (2006)
  - Total: 630
- Time zone: UTC+3:30 (IRST)
  - Summer (DST): UTC+4:30 (IRDT)

Salehan (Persian: صالحان, also Romanized as Şāleḩān) is a village in Kabgian Rural District, Kabgian District, Dana County, Kohgiluyeh and Boyer-Ahmad Province, Iran. At the 2006 census, its population was 630, in 131 families.
