= Joel Barkan =

American political scientist

Joel David Barkan (April 28, 1941, Toledo, Ohio – January 10, 2014, Mexico City) was an American political scientist with a particular expertise in political development in Africa (especially Kenya). He was a professor in the Department of Political Science at the University of Iowa for over forty years. He wrote numerous articles on the political development of Kenya for Foreign Affairs. Barkan was a senior associate at the Center for Strategic and International Studies, a think tank in Washington; he also worked as a consultant for the World Bank and US Agency for International Development. He also consulted for the United Kingdom's Department for International Development, the United Nations Development Programme, the National Democratic Institute and the National Endowment for Democracy.

Barkan studied at Cornell University as an undergraduate and then pursued a Ph.D at the University of California, Los Angeles. As well as his professorship at the University of Iowa, he was a visiting faculty at Princeton University, Johns Hopkins University, the University of Cape Town, the University of Dar es Salaam, the Institute of Development Studies in Nairobi, the Fondation Nationale des Sciences Politiques in Paris and the Centre for the Study of Developing Societies in New Delhi.

Barkan died aged 72 of a pulmonary embolism while on vacation in Mexico City.
