= Lash Kenar, Nur =

Lash Kenar لشكنار
- Village
- Location within Iran
- Coordinates: 36°25′07″N 51°55′29″E
- Country: Iran
- Province: Mazandaran
- County: Nur
- Bakhsh: Central
- Rural District: Mian Band

Population (2006)
  - Total: 126
- Time zone: UTC+3:30 (IRST)
  - Summer (DST): UTC+4:30 (IRDT)

Lash Kenar (Persian: لشكنار, also Romanized as Lash Kenār) is a village in Mian Band Rural District, in the Central District of Nur County, Mazandaran Province, Iran. At the 2006 census, its population was 126, in 30 families.
