= Seth Flynn Barkan =

American poet and journalist (1980–2023)

Seth "Fingers" Flynn Barkan (July 20, 1980 – November 3, 2023) was an American poet and journalist.

He grew up in and resided in the Las Vegas Valley in Nevada until his death, his city had a strong influence on the content and mood of his poetry. His first volume of poetry, A Cacophony of Near-Fatal Mistakes, was published in 2001 when he was only nineteen years old, and was described in an interview with Barkan as "collection of poems about booze, jazz and his "propensity towards disastrous relationships."

Barkan's second volume of poetry, Blue Wizard Is About To Die!: Prose, Poems, and Emoto-Versatronic Expressionist Pieces About Video Games (1980–2003), sold over 5000 copies internationally, making it one of the best-selling poetry books of 2004.

His most recent work, a chapbook entitled Your Madness And You: An Instructional Pamphlet, was written from the perspective of the fictional psychologist Doktor Nicodemus Strangelove, detailing the inevitable deterioration of sanity experienced by anyone who chooses to make Las Vegas their home.

== Bibliography ==
- A Cacophony of Near-Fatal Mistakes (paperback, 2001, Jazzclaw) ISBN 1-903932-20-3
- A Cacophony of Near-Fatal Mistakes (spoken word CD, 2002?, Rusty Immelman Press)
- Blue Wizard Is About To Die!: Prose, Poems, and Emoto-Versatronic Expressionist Pieces About Video Games (1980–2003) (paperback, 2004, Rusty Immelman Press) ISBN 0-9741000-0-5
- Your Madness And You: An Instructional Pamphlet (chapbook, 2005?, Rusty Immelman Press)
