= Barkhan, Uttar Pradesh =

Barkhan
- Village
- Location within Uttar Pradesh
- Coordinates: 28°30′00″N 79°42′00″E
- Country: India
- State: Uttar Pradesh
- Elevation: 180 m (590 ft)

Population (Census 2011)
  - Total: 4,078

Languages
  - Official: Hindi
- Time zone: UTC+5:30 (IST)
- PIN: 262406
- Nearest city: Nawabganj, Bareilly
- Literacy: 57%
- Climate: cold (Köppen)

Barkhan is a village in Nawabganj of Bareilly district, in Uttar Pradesh.
