= Steven Barkan =

American sociologist (born 1951)

Steven Barkan (born 1951) is an American sociologist, professor and chairperson of the Sociology department at the University of Maine.

== Education ==
Barkan is a Phi Beta Kappa graduate of Trinity College, in Hartford, Connecticut where he studied sociology and later received his Ph.D. from the State University of New York at Stony Brook in the same field of study. Upon receiving his doctorate in 1980, he joined the faculty of the University of Maine.

== Career ==
Barkan served as president of the Society for the Study of Social Problems (SSSP) from 2008 to 2009, a position that has been held previously by such notables as Gary Alan Fine and Alvin Ward Gouldner. Barkan has chaired the SSSP's Law and Society Division and served as an editor of Social Problems, the Society's journal. Barkan has also edited the newsletter of the American Sociological Association's Collective Behavior and Social Movements section.

Barkan's work focuses on criminology and the collective behavior of social movements, especially commitment and participation in social movement organizations. His other areas of interest include the death penalty, feminist activism, public opinion about crime and punishment, and racial attitudes, and household crowding and child well-being. He has published in many different journals, including the American Sociological Review, Journal of Research in Crime and Delinquency, Social Forces, Social Problems, Sociological Inquiry, and Race and Society.

Barkan is noted for incorporating advanced statistical analysis to test hypotheses; one of his most popular teaching techniques is to incorporates ExplorIT software with large demographic data sets to provide students an interactive means of applying statistics tol sociology.

Barkan's Ph.D. dissertation, Protesters on Trial: Criminal Justice in the Southern Civil Rights and Vietnam Antiwar Movements, explored the dynamics between a government and those who protest its policies, both by traditional means and civil disobedience. Using the title movements as case studies, Barkan concluded that the government publicizes trials to exert social control on society in general.

Barkan uses criminology as a means to understand deviant behavior on an individual and social level rather than as a tool for law enforcement. In addition to numerous journal articles and essays on the subject, Barkan has written two popular and widely adopted introductory textbooks. Essentials of Criminal Justice (with George Bryjak) and Criminology: A Sociological Understanding, currently in its fifth edition.

== Publications ==
=== Books ===
- Essentials of Criminal Justice. Allyn & Bacon, 2004 (with George Bryjak)
- Criminology: A Sociological Understanding. Prentice Hall, 2nd ed., 2001
- Collective Violence. Allyn & Bacon, 2001 (with Lynne Snowden)
- Discovering Sociology: Using Microcase Explorit. MicroCase Corporation, 2nd ed., 2003
- Protestors on Trial: Criminal Justice in the Southern Civil Rights and Vietnam Anti-War Movements. Rutgers University Press, 1985.

=== Journal articles ===
- Household Crowding and Aggregate Crime Rates. Journal of Crime and Justice, 23(2000):47-64
- Racial Prejudice and Support by Whites for Police Use of Force. Justice Quarterly 15 (December 1998):743-753 (with Steven F. Cohn)
- Race, Issue Engagement, and Political Participation: Evidence from the 1987 General Social Survey. Race & Society 1 (Spring 1998):63-76
- Beyond Recruitment: Predictors of Differential Participation in a National Anti-Hunger Organization. Sociological Forum 10 (March 1995):113-134 (with Steven F. Cohn and William H. Whitaker)
- Racial Prejudice and Support for the Death Penalty by Whites. Journal of Research in Crime and Delinquency 31 (May 1994):202-209 (with Steven F. Cohn)
- Commitment Across the Miles: Ideological and Microstructural Sources of Support in a National Anti-Hunger Organization. Social Problems 40 (November 1993):362-373 (with Steven F. Cohn and William H. Whitaker)
- Activists Against Hunger: Membership Characteristics of a National Social Movement Organization. Sociological Forum 8 (March 1993):113-131 (with Steven F. Cohn and William H. Whitaker)
- Predictors of Rank-and-File Feminist Activism: Evidence from the 1983 General Social Survey. Social Problems 39 (November 1992):332-344 (with Pat D. Dauphinais)
- Punitive Attitudes Toward Criminals: Racial Consensus or Racial Conflict? Social Problems 38 (May 1991):287-296 (with Steven F. Cohn and William A. Halteman)
- Law, Power, and Political Trials. Sociologie et Societes 18 (April 1986):153-161.
- Interorganizational Conflict in the Southern Civil Rights Movement.: Sociological Inquiry 56 (Spring 1986):190-209
- Legal Control of the Southern Civil Rights Movement. American Sociological Review 49 (August 1984):552-565
- Jury Nullification in Political Trials. Social Problems 31(October 1983):28-45.
- Political Trials and Resource Mobilization: Towards an Understanding of Social Movement Litigation. Social Forces 58 (March 1980):944-961.
- Strategic, Tactical and Organizational Dilemmas of the Protest Movement Against Nuclear Power. Social Problems 27 (October 1979):19-37.
- Political Trials and the Pro Se Defendant in the Adversary System. Social Problems 24 (February 1977):324-336

=== Book chapters ===
- Racial Prejudice and Support by Whites for Punitive Sanctions Against Criminals. In Sandra Browning et al. (eds.), For the Common Good, forthcoming (with Steven F. Cohn)
- The Social Science Significance of the O.J. Simpson Case. In Greg Barak (ed.), Representing OJ: Murder, Criminal Justice and Mass Culture. Harrow and Heston, 1996.
- Criminal Prosecutions in the Southern Civil Rights and Vietnam Anit-War Movements: Repression and Dissent in Political Trials. In Steven Spitzer (ed.), Research in Law and Sociology, vol. 3. JA1 Press, 1980.

=== Encyclopedia articles ===
- The Drug Legalization Debate. In Clifton D. Bryant (ed.), The Encyclopedia of Criminology and Deviant Behavior. Philadelphia: Taylor and Francis, 2000.
- Clamshell Alliance. In Christopher Kruegler et al.(eds.), An Encyclopedia of Non-Violent Action. Garland Publishing Company, 1996.
