= Nowshahr County =

County in Mazandaran province, Iran

Nowshahr County Persian: شهرستان نوشهر
- County
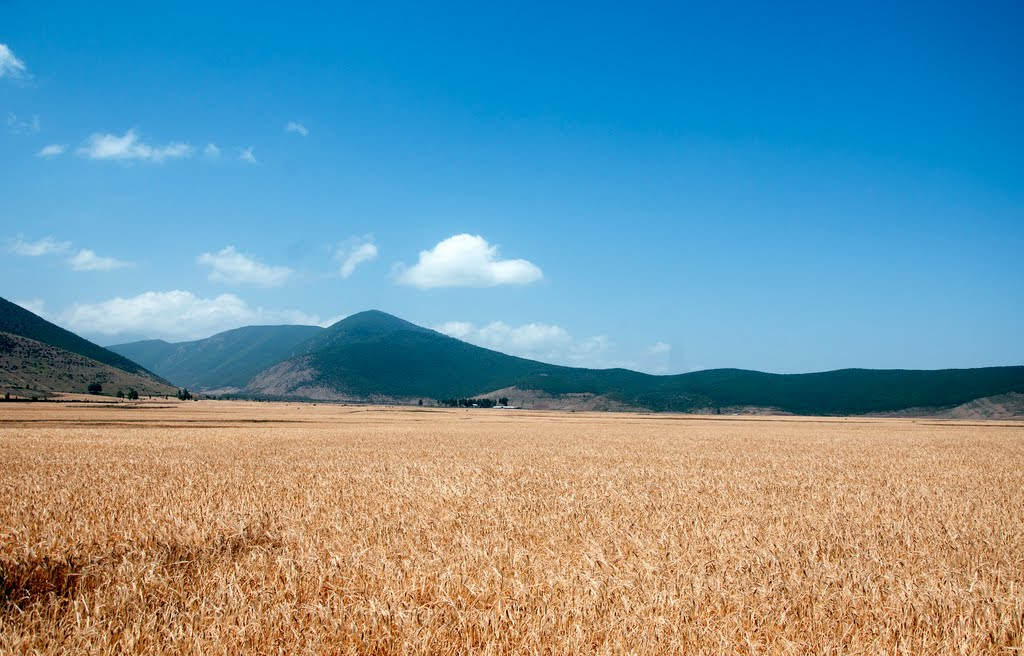
- Wheat fields of the Lashkar Plain

- Location of Nowshahr County in Mazandaran province (center left, green)

- Location of Mazandaran province in Iran
- Coordinates: 36°27′N 51°37′E
- Country: Iran
- Province: Mazandaran
- Capital: Nowshahr
- Districts: Central, Kojur

Area
  - Total: 1,716.50 km^{2} (662.74 sq mi)

Population (2016)
  - Total: 138,913
  - Density: 80.9281/km^{2} (209.603/sq mi)
- Time zone: UTC+3:30 (IRST)

Nowshahr County (Persian: شهرستان نوشهر) is in Mazandaran province, Iran. Its capital is the city of Nowshahr.

== History ==
The village of Pul was converted to a city in 2010, and the village of Kojur became a city in 2012.

== Demographics ==
=== Population ===
At the time of the 2006 National Census, the county's population was 116,334 in 31,842 households. The following census in 2011 counted 128,647 people in 38,496 households. The 2016 census measured the population of the county as 138,913 in 45,759 households.

=== Administrative divisions ===
Nowshahr County's population history and administrative structure over three consecutive censuses are shown in the following table.

Nowshahr County Population
| Administrative Divisions | 2006 | 2011 | 2016 |
|---|---|---|---|
| Central District | 102,131 | 108,976 | 118,015 |
| Baladeh Kojur RD | 17,085 | 17,199 | 18,521 |
| Kalej RD | 12,427 | 12,786 | 13,727 |
| Kheyrud Kenar RD | 32,041 | 35,613 | 36,364 |
| Nowshahr (city) | 40,578 | 43,378 | 49,403 |
| Kojur District | 14,203 | 19,671 | 20,897 |
| Panjak-e Rastaq RD | 4,437 | 4,151 | 4,577 |
| Tavabe-ye Kojur RD | 4,851 | 6,360 | 3,068 |
| Zanus Rastaq RD | 4,915 | 6,354 | 6,982 |
| Kojur (city) | | | 3,120 |
| Pul (city) | | 2,806 | 3,150 |
| Total | 116,334 | 128,647 | 138,913 |
RD = Rural District

== Tourism ==
There are several tourist attractions in Nowshahr County, including several waterfalls and villages. Some sights are listed below:

- Sisangan Forest Park
- Farakhin Lake: Located inside the Hyrcanian forests, the lake is at an elevation of 790 m (2,590 ft) above see level and is completely surrounded by forest trees. Darno waterfall is located near the lake.
- Div Cheshme
- Avidar reservoir
- Nowshahr Botanical Garden
- Arvah Lake
- Khanikan Forest Park
- Kandolus village
- Largan village

== See also ==
Media related to Nowshahr County at Wikimedia Commons
