= Kojur District =

District in Mazandaran province, Iran

Kojur District Persian: بخش کجور
- District
- Location within Iran
- Coordinates: 36°24′N 51°35′E
- Country: Iran
- Province: Mazandaran
- County: Nowshahr
- Capital: Pul

Population (2016)
  - Total: 20,897
- Time zone: UTC+3:30 (IRST)

Kojur District (Persian: بخش کجور) is in Nowshahr County, Mazandaran province, Iran. Its capital is the city of Pul.

== History ==
The village of Pul was converted to a city in 2010, and the village of Kojur became a city in 2012.

== Demographics ==
=== Population ===
At the time of the 2006 National Census, the district's population was 14,203 in 4,028 households. The following census in 2011 counted 19,671 people in 6,250 households. The 2016 census measured the population of the district as 20,897 inhabitants in 7,327 households.

=== Administrative divisions ===
Kojur District Population
| Administrative Divisions | 2006 | 2011 | 2016 |
|---|---|---|---|
| Panjak-e Rastaq RD | 4,437 | 4,151 | 4,577 |
| Tavabe-ye Kojur RD | 4,851 | 6,360 | 3,068 |
| Zanus Rastaq RD | 4,915 | 6,354 | 6,982 |
| Kojur (city) | | | 3,120 |
| Pul (city) | | 2,806 | 3,150 |
| Total | 14,203 | 19,671 | 20,897 |
RD = Rural District
