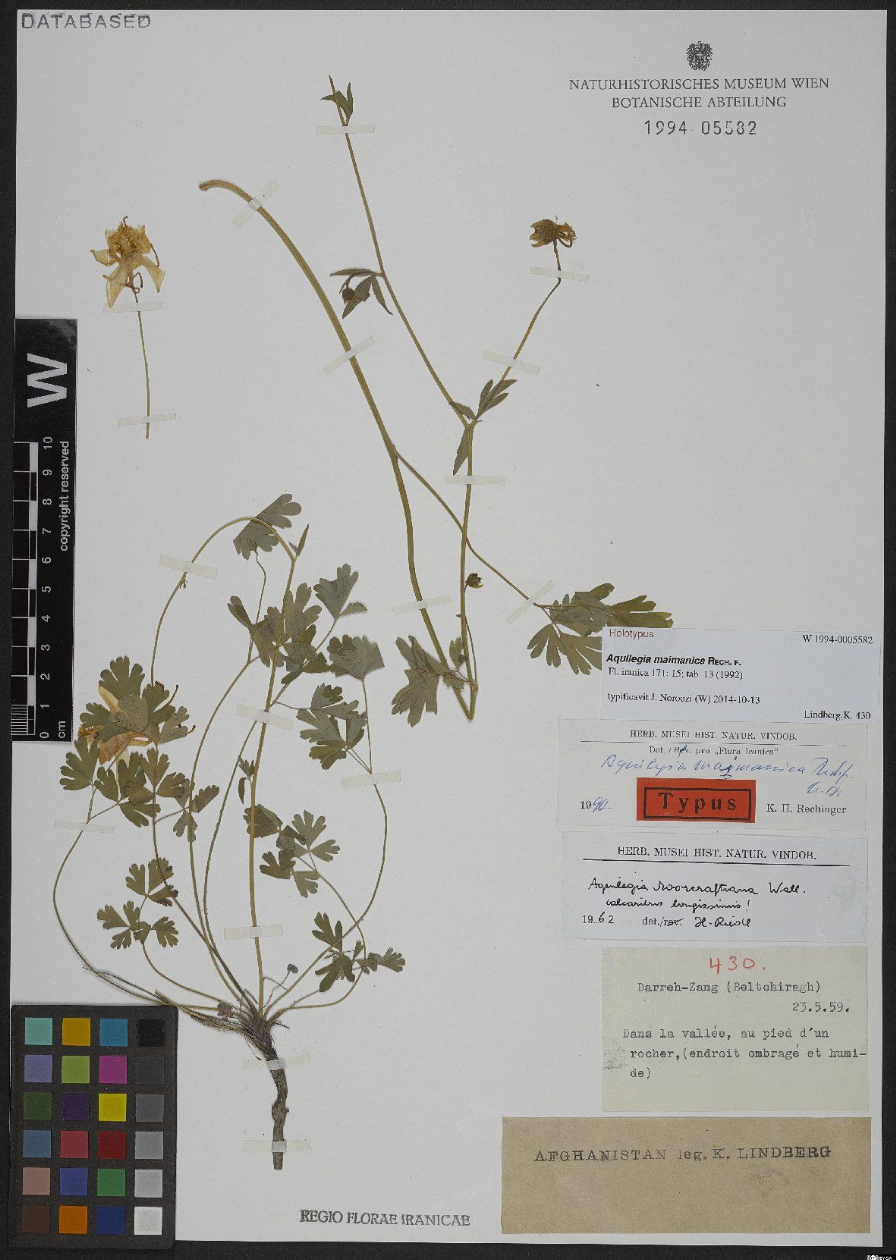
- Holotype of Aquilegia maimanica

Scientific classification
- Kingdom: Plantae
- Clade: Tracheophytes
- Clade: Angiosperms
- Clade: Eudicots
- Order: Ranunculales
- Family: Ranunculaceae
- Genus: Aquilegia
- Species: A. maimanica

Binomial name
- Aquilegia maimanica Rech. fil. In: Fl. Iranica

= Aquilegia maimanica =

Species of flowering plant

Aquilegia maimanica is a species of flowering plant in the family Ranunculaceae native to the area of the former Meymaneh Province in northwestern Afghanistan. The plant is understood as related to Aquilegia moorcroftiana, which has a range spanning into Afghanistan. A. maimanica has pale-blue and white flowers. The species was first described by the Flora Iranica in 1992 from specimens collected by Karl Heinz Rechinger in 1959.

== Description ==
Aquilegia maimanica is a perennial plant that favors temperate biomes. The plant grows with branching stems reaching heights between 40 centimetres (16 in) and 60 centimetres (24 in) tall. The stems feature many cauline leaves. The plant's flowers are suberect with pale-blue sepals and nectar spurs and white blades. The sepals are around 20 millimetres (0.79 in) long and the narrow, slightly curved spurs extend between 20 millimetres (0.79 in) and 25 millimetres (0.98 in) long.

== Taxonomy ==
Aquilegia maimanica was first described by Karl Heinz Rechinger in 1992 within the Flora Iranica. The plant was described from two type specimens. The holotype was collected by Austrian botanist Rechinger on May 23, 1959, in Afghanistan and is held in the herbarium of the Natural History Museum, Vienna. The type locality is near Bilchiragh and it is listed as having been collected in a valley. An isotype is held by the University of Graz's Institute of Plant Sciences.

In the descriptions provided by Flora Iranica, A. maimanica was one of three species of Aquilegia described as "species nova ex affinitate remota Aquilegia moorcroftiana", with the other two being Aquilegia gracillima and Aquilegia microcentra. American botanist Robert Nold wrote in 2003 that political circumstances meant that the species were likely relegated to being "nothing but names for years to come" and felt that further specimens were necessary to thoroughly confirm if the plants are distinct species related to, or variants of, A. moorcroftiana. When describing the species, Nold listed them under his listing of A. moorcroftiana, "hoping, somehow, that A. moorcroftiana is even more polymorphic than anyone suspects" and that A. maimanica was a localized variant.

=== Etymology ===
The word "columbine" derives from the Latin word columbinus, meaning "dove", a reference to the flowers' appearance of a group of doves. The genus name Aquilegia may come from the Latin word for "eagle", aquila, in reference to the pedals' resemblance to eagle talons. Aquilegia may also derive from aquam legere, which is Latin for "to collect water", or aquilegium, a Latin word for a container of water. Maimanica refers to the region of origin, the former Meymaneh (Maimana) Province.

== Distribution ==
Aquilegia maimanica is native to the area of the former Meymaneh Province in northwestern Afghanistan.

== Conservation ==
The Royal Botanic Gardens, Kew's Plants of the World Online predicted the extinction risk level for A. maimanica as "threatened" with a low confidence level.
