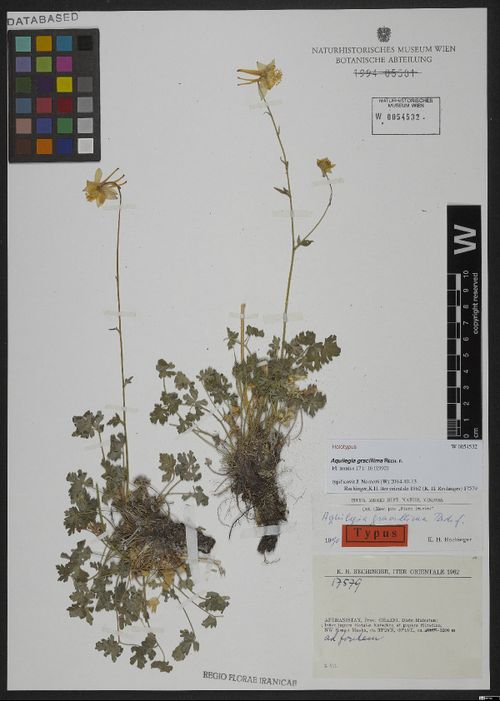
- Holotype of Aquilegia gracillima

Scientific classification
- Kingdom: Plantae
- Clade: Tracheophytes
- Clade: Angiosperms
- Clade: Eudicots
- Order: Ranunculales
- Family: Ranunculaceae
- Genus: Aquilegia
- Species: A. gracillima

Binomial name
- Aquilegia gracillima Rech. fil. In: Fl. Iranica

Synonyms
- Aquilegia helmandica Christopher Grey-Wilson

= Aquilegia gracillima =

Species of flowering plant

Aquilegia gracillima is a species of flowering plant in the family Ranunculaceae native to the area near Ghazni in eastern Afghanistan. The plant is understood as related to Aquilegia moorcroftiana, which has a range spanning into Afghanistan.

A. gracillima has small flowers that are white with rose tinging; its specific name literally translates as "very slender" or "insignificant". The species was first described by the Flora Iranica in 1992 from a specimen collected by Karl Heinz Rechinger in 1962.

== Description ==
Aquilegia gracillima is a perennial plant that favors temperate biomes. The plant has glandular-pilose stems and is particularly cespitose. The plant's flowers are nodding and are colored white with rose tinging. The sepals are either oblong or elliptic-lanceolate and extend 10 millimetres (0.39 in) to 12 millimetres (0.47 in) in length. The nectar spurs are slender, ranging between 15 millimetres (0.59 in) and 17 millimetres (0.67 in) long. The blades are 7 millimetres (0.28 in) long.

== Taxonomy ==
Aquilegia gracillima was first described by Austrian botanist Karl Heinz Rechinger in 1992 within the Flora Iranica. The plant was described from a single specimen. The holotype was collected by Rechinger on July 2, 1962, in Afghanistan and is held in the herbarium of the Natural History Museum, Vienna. The type locality is near Ghazni. An isotype is held by the University of Graz's Institute of Plant Sciences.

In the descriptions provided by Flora Iranica, A. gracillima was one of three species of Aquilegia described as "species nova ex affinitate remota Aquilegia moorcroftiana", with the other two being Aquilegia maimanica and Aquilegia microcentra. American botanist Robert Nold wrote in 2003 that political circumstances meant that the species were likely relegated to being "nothing but names for years to come" and felt that further specimens were necessary to thoroughly confirm if the plants are distinct species related to, or variants of, A. moorcroftiana. When describing the species, Nold listed them under his listing of A. moorcroftiana, "hoping, somehow, that A. moorcroftiana is even more polymorphic than anyone suspects" and that A. gracillima was a localized variant.

According to Nold, the species Aquilegia helmandica (described in 1974 by Christopher Grey-Wilson) has been considered a synonym of A. gracillima. The Royal Botanic Gardens, Kew's Plants of the World Online instead considers A. helmandica a synonym for A moorcroftiana var. afghanica. The Flora Iranica considered A. helmandica a synonym for Aquilegia euchroma.

=== Etymology ===
The word columbine derives from the Latin word columbinus, meaning "dove", a reference to the flowers' appearance of a group of doves. The genus name Aquilegia may come from the Latin word for "eagle", aquila, in reference to the pedals' resemblance to eagle talons. Aquilegia may also derive from aquam legere, which is Latin for "to collect water", or aquilegium, a Latin word for a container of water. Gracillima, from Latin, can mean "very slender" or "insignificant".

== Distribution ==
A. gracillima is native to the area near Ghazni in eastern Afghanistan.

== Conservation ==
Plants of the World Online predicted the extinction risk level for A. gracillima as "threatened" with a low confidence level.
