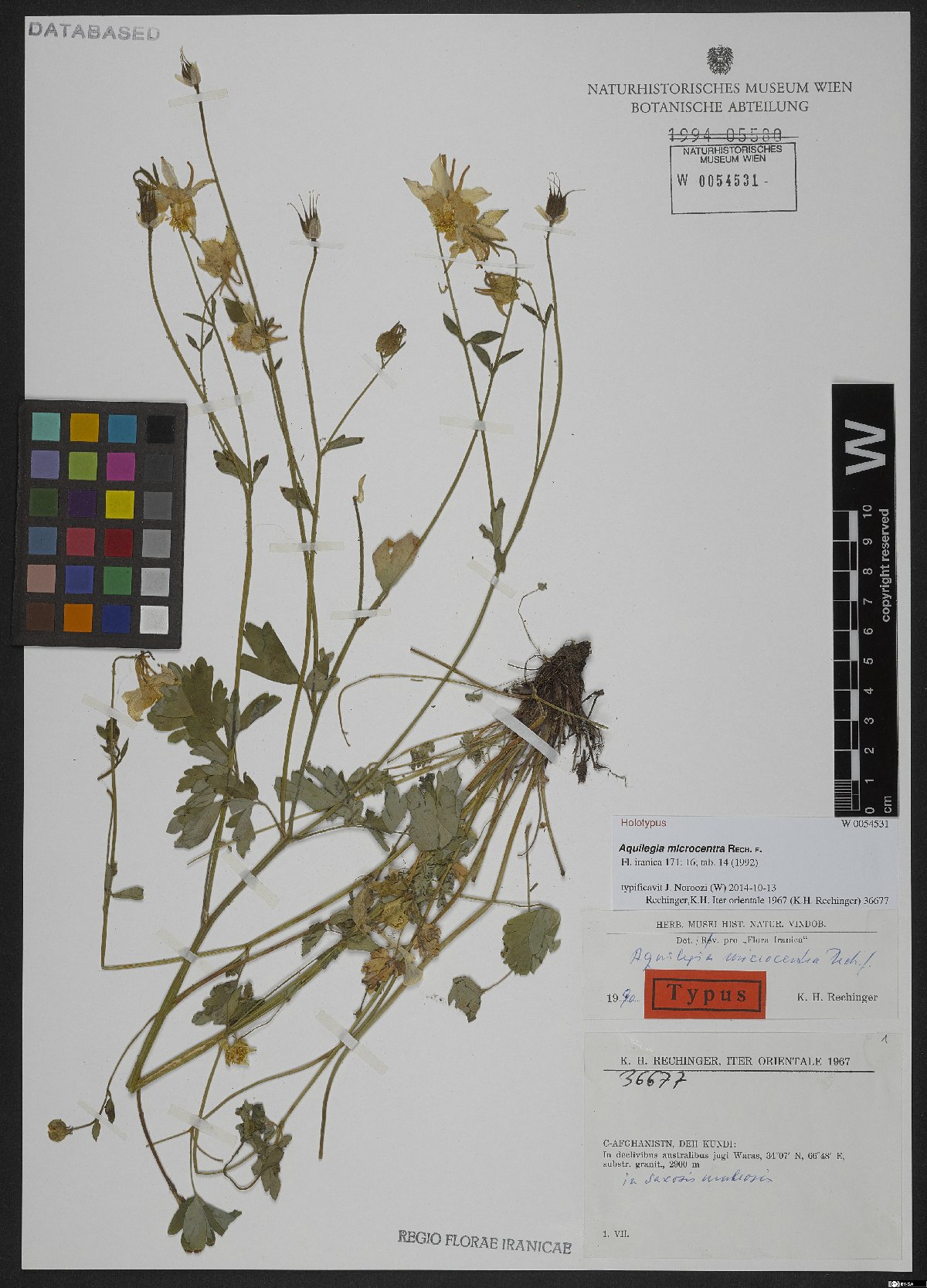
- Holotype of Aquilegia microcentra

Scientific classification
- Kingdom: Plantae
- Clade: Tracheophytes
- Clade: Angiosperms
- Clade: Eudicots
- Order: Ranunculales
- Family: Ranunculaceae
- Genus: Aquilegia
- Species: A. microcentra

Binomial name
- Aquilegia microcentra Fl. Iranica

= Aquilegia microcentra =

Species of flowering plant

Aquilegia microcentra is a species of flowering plant in the family Ranunculaceae native to Uruzgan Province in central and southeastern Afghanistan. The plant is understood as related to Aquilegia moorcroftiana, which has a range spanning into Afghanistan. A. microcentra has small, white flowers. The species was first described by the Flora Iranica in 1992 from specimens collected by Karl Heinz Rechinger in 1967.

== Description ==
Aquilegia microcentra is a perennial plant that favors temperate biomes. It is densely caespitose (growing in tufts) with glabrous basal leaves. Its stems are mildly glabrous below while granular and, like the inflorescence, pubescent. The plant's flowers are small, nodding, and white. There are sepals that are slightly ovate-elliptic which extend 10 millimetres (0.39 in) in length. The flowers feature nectar spurs that are a bit longer than the sepals.

== Taxonomy ==
Aquilegia microcentra was first described by Austrian botanist Karl Heinz Rechinger in 1992 within the Flora Iranica. The plant was described from two type specimens. The holotype was collected by Rechinger on July 1, 1967, in Afghanistan and is held in the herbarium of the Natural History Museum, Vienna. The type locality was given as "Deh Kundi" and it is listed as having been collected at an elevation of 2,900 metres (9,500 ft). An isotype is held by the University of Graz's Institute of Plant Sciences.

In the descriptions provided by Flora Iranica, A. microcentra was one of three species of Aquilegia described as "species nova ex affinitate remota Aquilegia moorcroftiana", with the other two being Aquilegia gracillima and Aquilegia maimanica. American botanist Robert Nold wrote in 2003 that political circumstances meant that the species were likely relegated to being "nothing but names for years to come" and felt that further specimens were necessary to thoroughly confirm if the plants are distinct species related to, or variants of, A. moorcroftiana. When describing the species, Nold listed them under his listing of A. moorcroftiana, "hoping, somehow, that A. moorcroftiana is even more polymorphic than anyone suspects" and that A. microcentra was a localized variant.

=== Etymology ===
The word columbine derives from the Latin word columbinus, meaning "dove", a reference to the flowers' appearance of a group of doves. The genus name Aquilegia may come from the Latin word for "eagle", aquila, in reference to the pedals' resemblance to eagle talons. Aquilegia may also derive from aquam legere, which is Latin for "to collect water", or aquilegium, a Latin word for a container of water. Microcentra means "small center".

== Distribution ==
Aquilegia microcentra is native to Uruzgan Province in central and southeastern Afghanistan.

== Conservation ==
The Royal Botanic Gardens, Kew's Plants of the World Online predicted the extinction risk level for A. microcentra as "threatened" with a low confidence level.
