= Spondyloepimetaphyseal dysplasia, Guo–Campeau type =

- Specialty: Medical genetics, orthopedics
- Symptoms: Severe short stature, skeletal abnormalities, abnormal development of fingers and toes
- Causes: Biallelic pathogenic variants in ERI1

Spondyloepimetaphyseal dysplasia, Guo–Campeau type (SEMDGC) is an inherited skeletal dysplasia associated with pathogenic variants in ERI1. It causes pronounced short stature and abnormalities affecting the spine, pelvis, hips, and limbs. Fingers or toes may be shortened, underdeveloped, or absent, and facial features vary between affected individuals. The disorder follows an autosomal recessive inheritance pattern.

== Signs and symptoms ==
Skeletal manifestations include limb shortening and abnormalities of the hands and feet. Reported findings include short digits, joined digits, curved fingers, absent toes, restricted elbow extension, and dislocation of the radial head. Hydronephrosis and vesicoureteral reflux have also been recorded.

Radiographs show flattened vertebral bodies, irregular vertebral endplates, and scoliosis in affected individuals. Severity varies: two siblings are alive into their twenties, whereas three other individuals with the severe skeletal phenotype died in infancy or early childhood. These observations describe the initial series rather than an established survival estimate.

== Genetics ==
ERI1 is located on chromosome 8p23.1. It encodes a 3′-to-5′ exoribonuclease involved in RNA processing. Reported severe cases have carried at least one pathogenic missense variant. By contrast, individuals with two null alleles have generally shown milder skeletal involvement. The latter presentation, involving digital abnormalities and mild intellectual disability, is classified separately as Hoxha–Aliu syndrome (OMIM 620662).

== Diagnosis ==
The original study combined clinical and radiographic assessment with exome or genome sequencing. Candidate variants were investigated by Sanger sequencing and where parental samples were available, family studies.

== History ==
Guo and colleagues described the disorder in 2023. Their study included eight individuals from seven families with ERI1 variants; five individuals from four families had the severe skeletal phenotype.

== Research ==
Cell experiments linked the missense variants to impaired exonuclease activity, abnormal 5.8S ribosomal RNA processing, and reduced histone messenger RNA degradation. Patient-derived induced pluripotent stem cells also showed impaired cartilage differentiation.

A 2025 review emphasized that the mechanism connecting altered RNA metabolism to the skeletal abnormalities remains incompletely understood. It also noted that Eri1-knockout mice do not reproduce the full human phenotype, limiting their usefulness as a model of the severe disorder.
