= Wildlife of Iran =

The wildlife of Iran include the fauna and flora of Iran.

One of the most famous animals of Iran is the critically endangered Asiatic cheetah (Acinonyx jubatus venaticus), which today survives only in Iran. Another notable species is the Iranian ground jay (Podoces pleskei), the only bird endemic to Iran.

== History ==
The animals of Iran were described by Hamdallah Mustawfi in the 14th century. In the 18th and 19th centuries, Samuel Gottlieb Gmelin and Édouard Ménétries explored the Caspian Sea area and the Talysh Mountains to document Caspian fauna. Several naturalists followed in the 19th century, including Filippo de Filippi, William Thomas Blanford, and Nikolai Zarudny who documented mammal, bird, reptile, amphibian and fish species. The Complete Fauna of Iran by Eskandar Firouz, documents a wide range of species across the country's ecosystems

== Flora ==
More than one-tenth of the country is forested. The most extensive forest is found on the mountain slopes rising from the Caspian Sea, with stands of oak, ash, elm, cypress, and other valuable trees. On the plateau proper, areas of scrub oak appear on the best-watered mountain slopes, and villagers cultivate orchards and grow the plane tree, poplar, willow, walnut, beech, maple, and mulberry. Wild plants and shrubs spring from the barren land in the spring and afford pasturage, but the summer sun burns them away. According to FAO reports, the major types of forests that exist in Iran and their respective areas are:

- Caspian forests of the northern districts (33,000 km^{2})
- Limestone mountainous forests in the northeastern districts (Juniperus forests, 13,000 km^{2})
- Pistachio forests in the eastern, southern and southeastern districts (26,000 km^{2})
- Oak forests in the central and western districts (100,000 km^{2})
- Shrubs of the Dasht-e Kavir districts in the central and northeastern part of the country (10,000 km^{2})
- Sub-tropical forests of the southern coast (5,000 km^{2}) like the Hara forests.

== Fauna ==
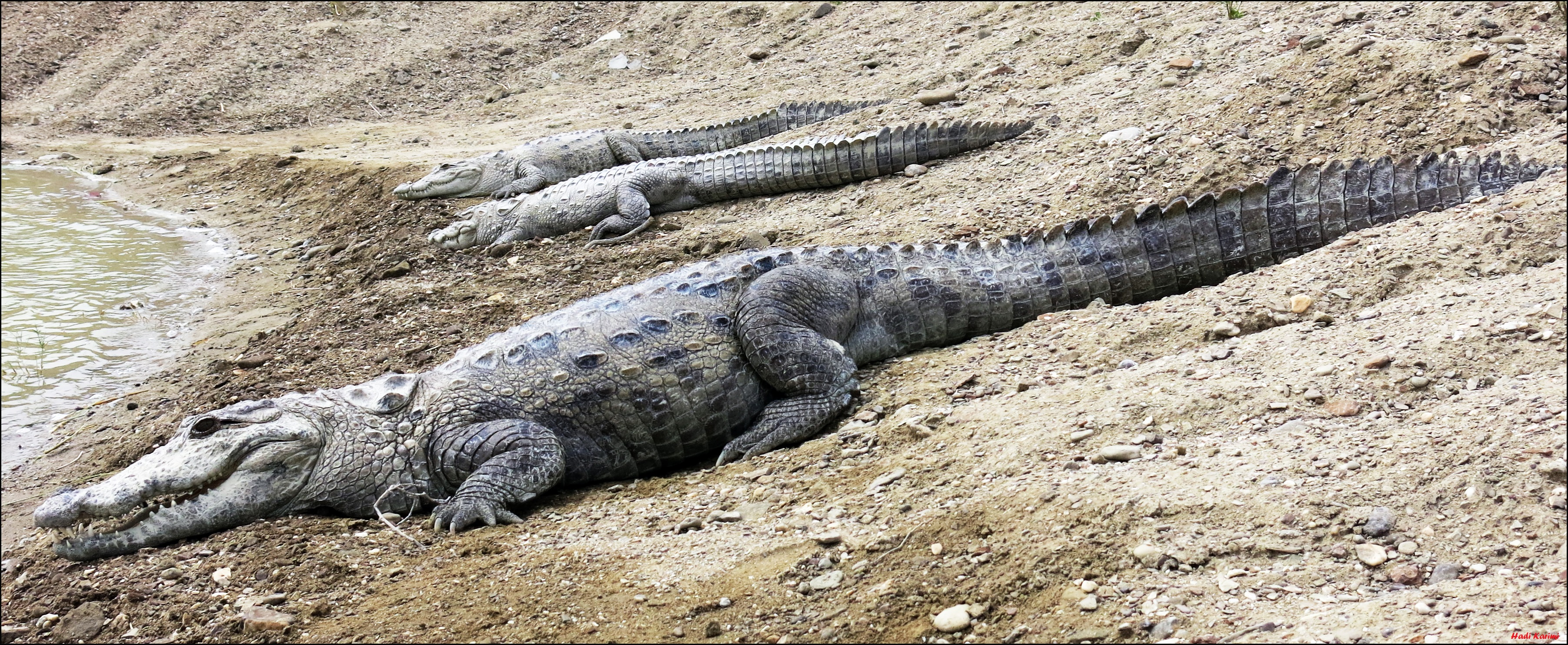
Mugger crocodile in Chabahar, Iran

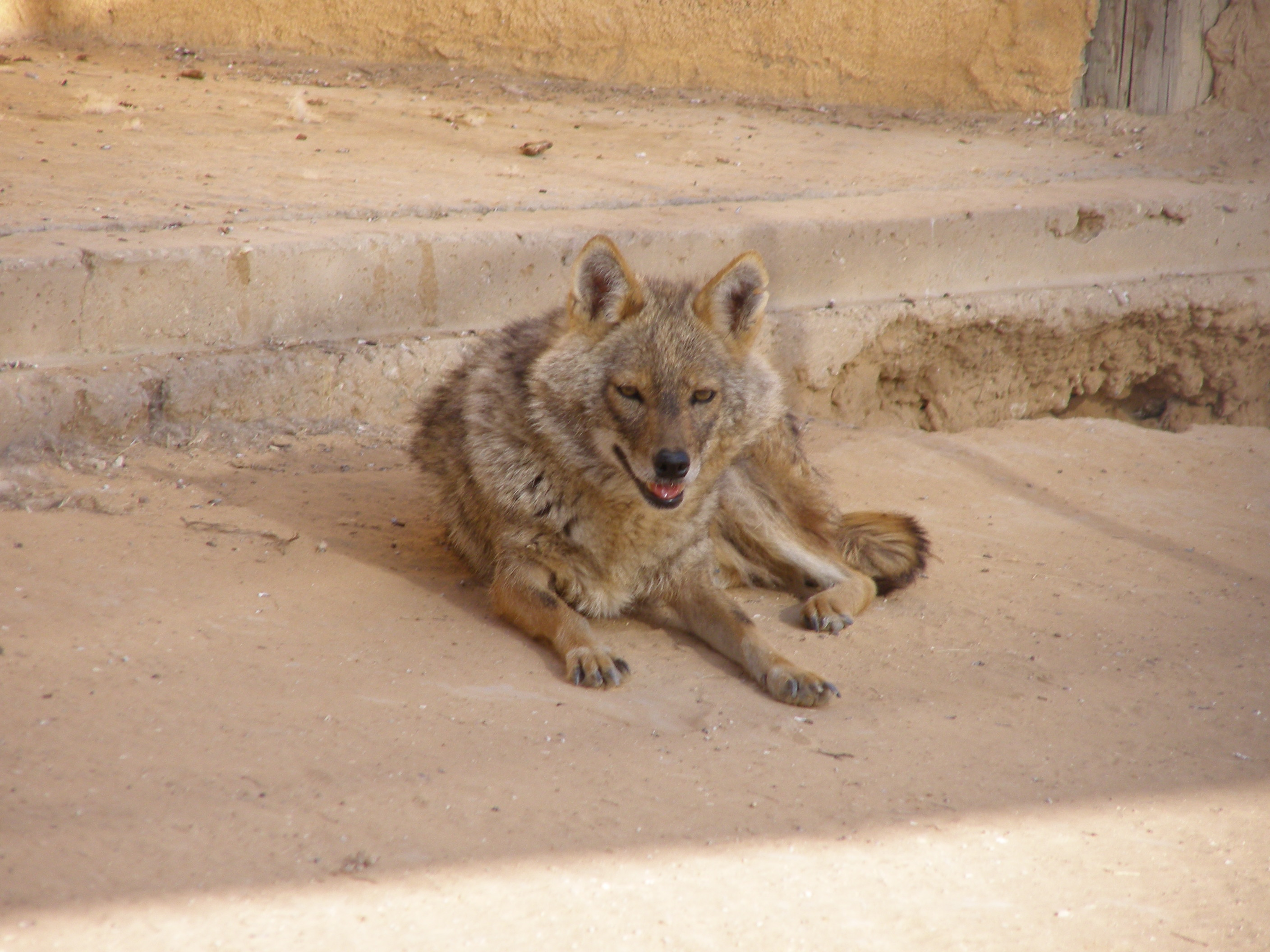
Golden jackal (Canis aureus)

Iran's living fauna includes 34 bat species, Indian grey mongoose, small Indian mongoose, golden jackal, Indian wolf, foxes, striped hyena, leopard, Eurasian lynx, brown bear and Asian black bear. Ungulate species include wild boar, urial, Armenian mouflon, red deer, and goitered gazelle.

=== Endangered ===
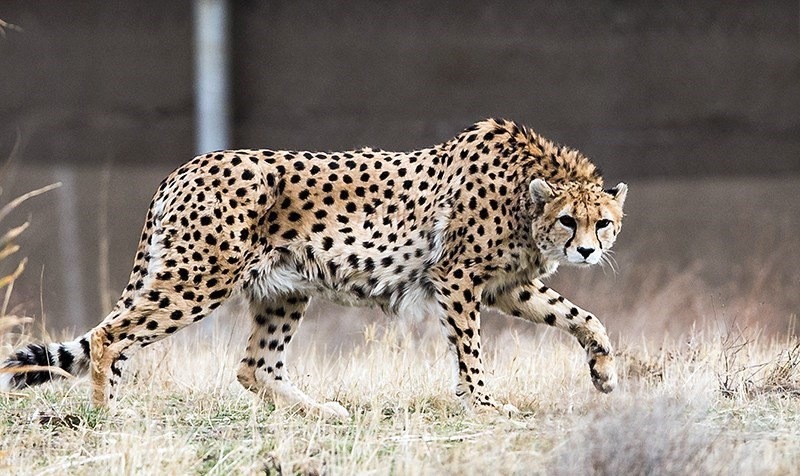
Asiatic cheetah

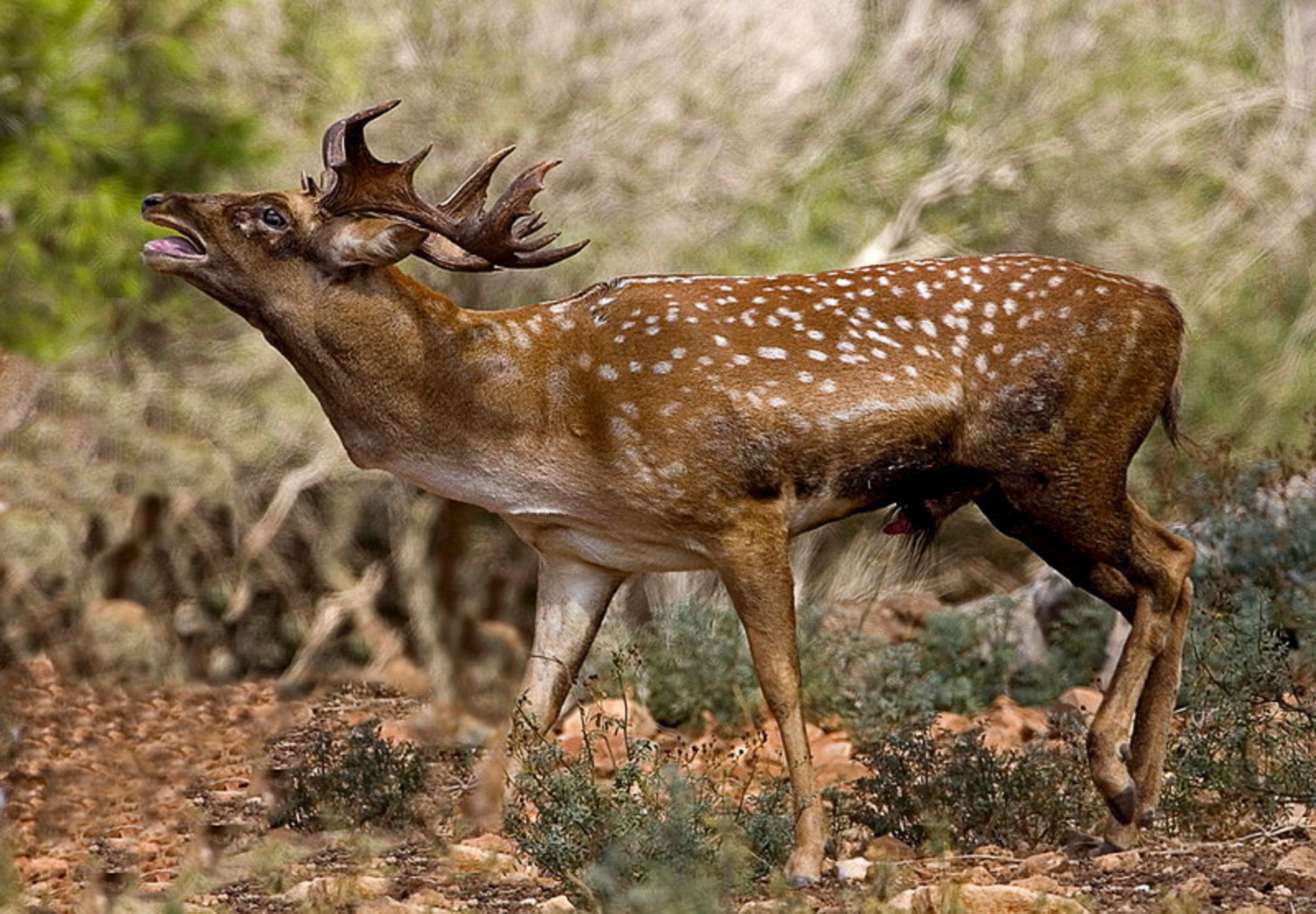
Persian fallow deer

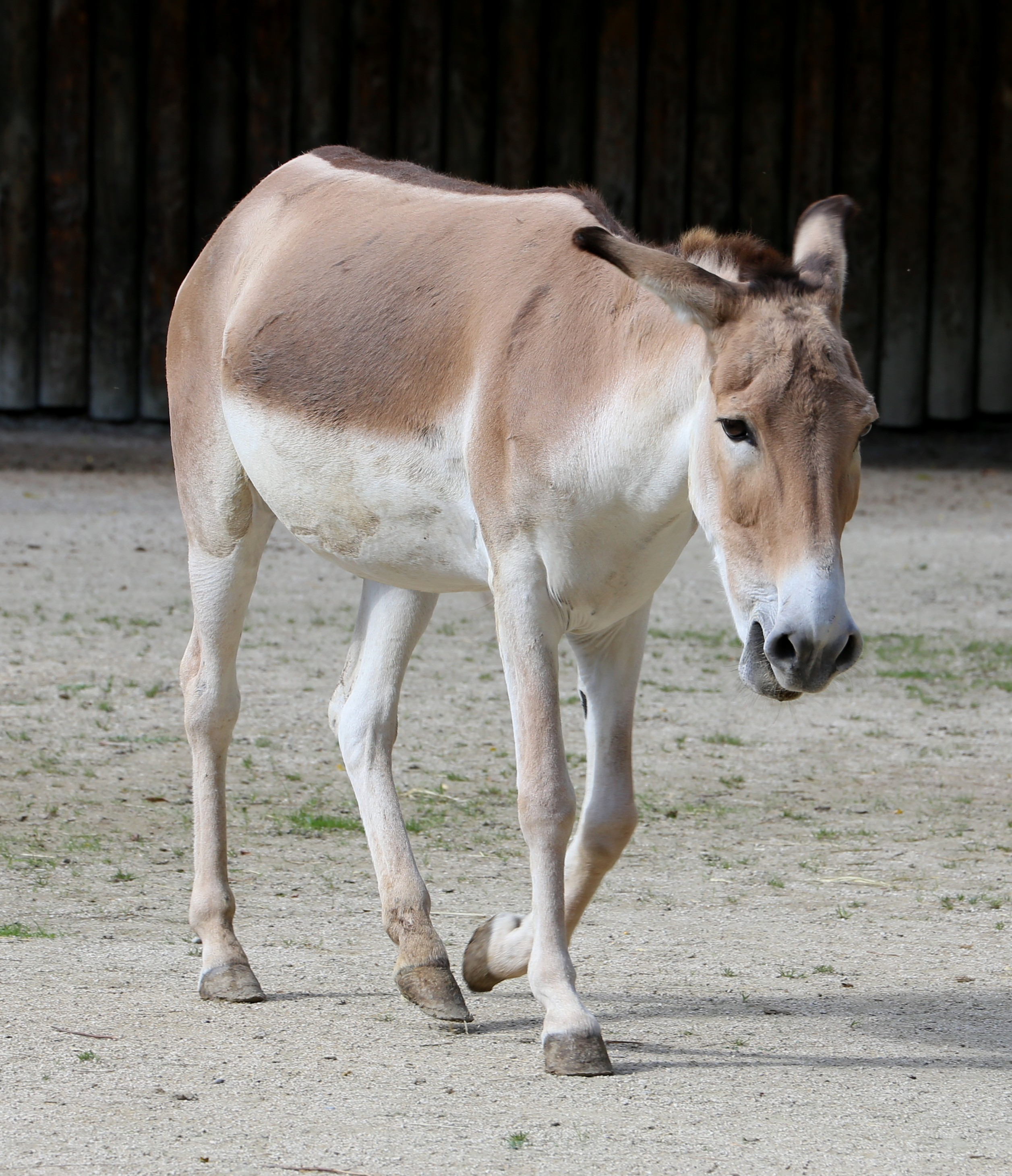
Persian onager

As of 2001, 20 of Iran's mammal species and 14 bird species were endangered. Endangered species in Iran include the Baluchistan bear, Asiatic cheetah, Caspian seal, Persian fallow deer, Siberian crane, hawksbill turtle, green turtle, Oxus cobra, Latifi's viper, dugong, Panthera pardus tulliana, Caspian Sea wolf, and dolphin. At least 74 species of Iranian wildlife are listed on the IUCN Red List, a sign of serious threats to the country's biodiversity. Majlis have shown disregard for wildlife by passing laws and regulations such as the act that lets the Ministry of Industries and Mines exploit mines without the involvement of the Department of Environment, and by approving large national development projects without demanding comprehensive study of their impact on wildlife habitats. The leopard's main range overlaps with that of bezoar ibex, which occurs throughout Alborz and Zagros mountain ranges, as well as smaller ranges within the Iranian Plateau. The leopard population is very sparse, due to loss of habitat, loss of natural prey, and population fragmentation. Apart from bezoar ibex, wild sheep, boar, deer, and domestic livestock constitute leopard prey in Iran.

=== Extinct ===
- Cave hyena, native to Iran during the Last Glacial Period (as evidenced by remains in sites such as Wezmeh Cave), became extinct at an unknown date.
- Narrow-nosed rhinoceros native to Iran during the Last Glacial Period, became extinct at an unknown date.
- European wild ass, youngest records in Iran date to the 2nd millennium BC.
- The Syrian elephant roamed southern Iran, before vanishing there in ancient times.
- The Asiatic lion was recorded only in Iran's Khuzestan and Fars provinces. The last sighting occurred in 1957 in the Dez River valley. In the 1970s, Arzhan National Park was considered as a site for its reintroduction.
- The Caspian tiger used to occur in the northern region around the Caspian Sea, and in the Trans-Caucasian and Turkestan regions of the Union of Soviet Socialist Republics before 1960. The last tiger in Iran was reportedly sighted in Golestan National Park in 1958.

== See also ==
- List of birds of Iran
- List of mammals of Iran
- List of non-marine molluscs of Iran
- List of national parks and protected areas of Iran
- Geography of Iran
- Environmental issues in Iran

== Bibliography ==
- Rechinger, Karl Heinz, et al. (1963–2015). Flora Iranica. 181 parts. Graz: Akademische Druck- u. Verlagsanstalt.
