= Jan-Peter Frahm =

German botanist (1945–2014)

- Born: 14 February 1945; Hamburg
- Died: 5 February 2014 (aged 68); Belgium
- Education: University of Kiel
- Known for: Bryology
- Scientific career
- Fields: Botany
- Workplaces: University of Bonn
- Author abbrev. (botany): J.-P.Frahm

Jan-Peter Frahm (14 February 1945 – 5 February 2014) was a German botanist dedicated to the study of mosses. The standard author abbreviation J.-P.Frahm is used to indicate this person as the author when citing a botanical name.

== Career ==
Frahm studied biology and geography at the University of Hamburg before switching to the University of Kiel for his undergraduate degree. He returned to Kiel and earned his Ph.D. in botany in 1972. He then worked at the University of Duisburg, where he was appointed professor in 1981. Between 1978 and 1994 he issued a number of exsiccatae, among them Bryophyta Vogesiaca exsiccata (1985–1988) and Campylopodes exsiccatae (1980–1992). Research stays at foreign institutes (eg. Helsinki, Paris, Stockholm, Chicago) and a visiting professorship at the University of Alberta in 1989 followed. He moved from Duisburg to the University of Bonn in 1994.

He was honored in 1995 with the Richard Spruce Award by the International Association of Bryologists for excellence in bryology. He was also awarded by the University of Helsinki. In recognition of his achievements, new species such as Sphagnum frahmii, Porotrichum frahmii, Cololejeunea frahmii, Pylaisiella frahmii and Porothamnium frahmii were named after him. The genus Frahmiella in the family Brachytheciaceae also bears his name. In 2014, he became the namesake of the bryological online journal Frahmia.

Frahm conducted research on numerous topics of bryology and published more than 650 publications. Within his moss research, he was concerned with bioindication. Frahm noted that the improved air quality in cities has led to an increased number of lichen species colonizing urban areas. He also demonstrated that the release of ammonia by auto-catalysts causes nitrogen-loving lichens and mosses and nitrogen-emitting plants to settle along roads.

Frahm was also passionate about cooking. He published his own cook book, 10000 Kochideen, in 2007.

== Journalistic activity ==
Frahm was the publisher of the following journals:

- Archive For Bryology, an internet magazine
- Bryologische Rundbriefe, an electronic newsletter with information on moss research in Germany
- Limprichtia, a magazine for moss research in Germany
- Tropical Bryology, an international non-profit journal on the biology of tropical mosses; now under the title Bryophyte Diversity and Evolution

== Selected publications ==
- Frahm, Jan-Peter; Giese, Monika; Padberg, Monika; Koponen, Timo; Norris, Daniel H. (1985). Bryophyte Flora of the Huon Peninsula, Papua New Guinea. IX. Atractylocarpus, Bryohumbertia, Campylopodium and Campylopus (Dicranaceae, Musci) (Acta Botanica Fennica, 131). Finnish Zoological and Botanical Publishing Board.
- Frahm, Jan-Peter (1987). A revised list of the Campylopus species of the world. I. Duell-Hermanns.
- Frahm, Jan-Peter; Gradstein, S. Robbert (1990). Ecology of tropical bryophytes: a bibliography. Tropical Bryology 3: 75–77.
- Frahm, Jan-Peter; Gradstein, S. Robbert (1991). An altitudinal zonation of the tropical rain forest using bryophytes. Journal of Biogeography 18: 669–678.
- Frahm, Jan-Peter (1998). Moose als Bioindikatoren. Quelle & Meyer. ISBN 9783494012711.
- Frahm, Jan-Peter; Frey, Wolfgang (2004). Moosflora. Ulmer.
- Frey, Wolfgang; Frahm, Jan-Peter; Fischer, Eberhard; Lobin, Wolfram (2006). The Liverworts, Mosses and Ferns of Europe. Apollo Books.
- Frahm, Jan-Peter (2007). 10000 Kochideen: Was soll ich denn mal kochen. Books On Demand.
- Frahm, Jan-Peter (2010). Mosses and Liverworts of the Mediterranean: An Illustrated Field Guide. Books on Demand. ISBN 9780946589708.
- Frahm, Jan-Peter; Froitzheim, Nikolaus; Pretscher, Peter; Sievers, Rolf; Weddeling, Klaus (2010). Bonn und Umgebung: Führer zu naturkundlichen Exkursionen. Bouvier Verlag. ISBN 9783416033015.
- Frahm, Jan-Peter (2013). Mosses and Liverworts of the Azores and Madeira. Books on Demand. ISBN 9783848214464.
- Frahm, Jan-Peter; Schumm, Felix; Stapper, Norbert J. (2013). Epiphytische Flechten als Umweltgütezeiger: - eine Bestimmungshilfe. Books on Demand. ISBN 9783848289813.
- Frahm, Jan-Peter (2018). Biologie der Moose. Springer Berlin Heidelberg. ISBN 9783662576069.
