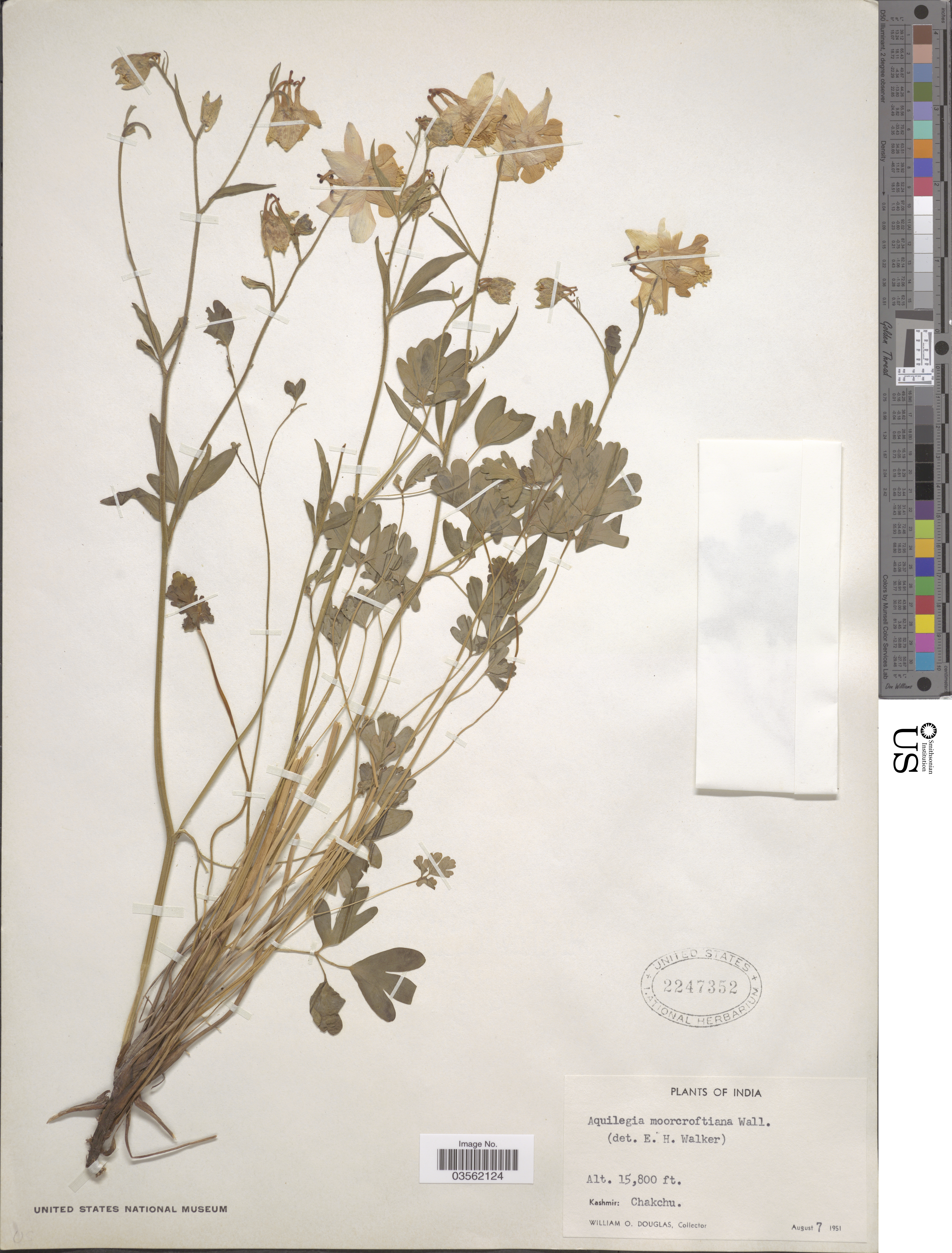
- Aquilegia moorcroftiana specimen

Scientific classification
- Kingdom: Plantae
- Clade: Tracheophytes
- Clade: Angiosperms
- Clade: Eudicots
- Order: Ranunculales
- Family: Ranunculaceae
- Genus: Aquilegia
- Species: A. moorcroftiana

Binomial name
- Aquilegia moorcroftiana Wall. ex Royle

Synonyms
- List: Aquilegia vulgaris var. moorcroftiana (Wall. ex Royle) Aitch. Aquilegia vulgaris subsp. moorcroftiana (Wall. ex Royle) Brühl

= Aquilegia moorcroftiana =

Species of flowering plant

Aquilegia moorcroftiana is a species of flowering plant in the genus Aquilegia (columbines) in the family Ranunculaceae. It is native to central Asia, with a range spanning Afghanistan, Tajikistan, Pakistan, Kashmir, Nepal, and Tibet. A. moorcroftiana grows at the highest elevation of any species of columbine, with examples frequently found at over 4,000 metres (13,000 ft) of elevation.

The species is named after William Moorcroft, a British mountaineer and explorer of Ladakh and Tibet.

== Description ==
Aquilegia moorcroftiana generally ranges from 20 to 40 centimetres (7.9 to 15.7 in) tall with stems usually featuring two or more flowers. The flower petal blades, which range between 10 and 13 millimetres (0.39 and 0.51 in) long, are blue with rounded tips. Sometimes they have light yellow margins. The blue-purple nectar spurs are thin and extend for 12–17 millimetres (0.47–0.67 in).

== Taxonomy ==
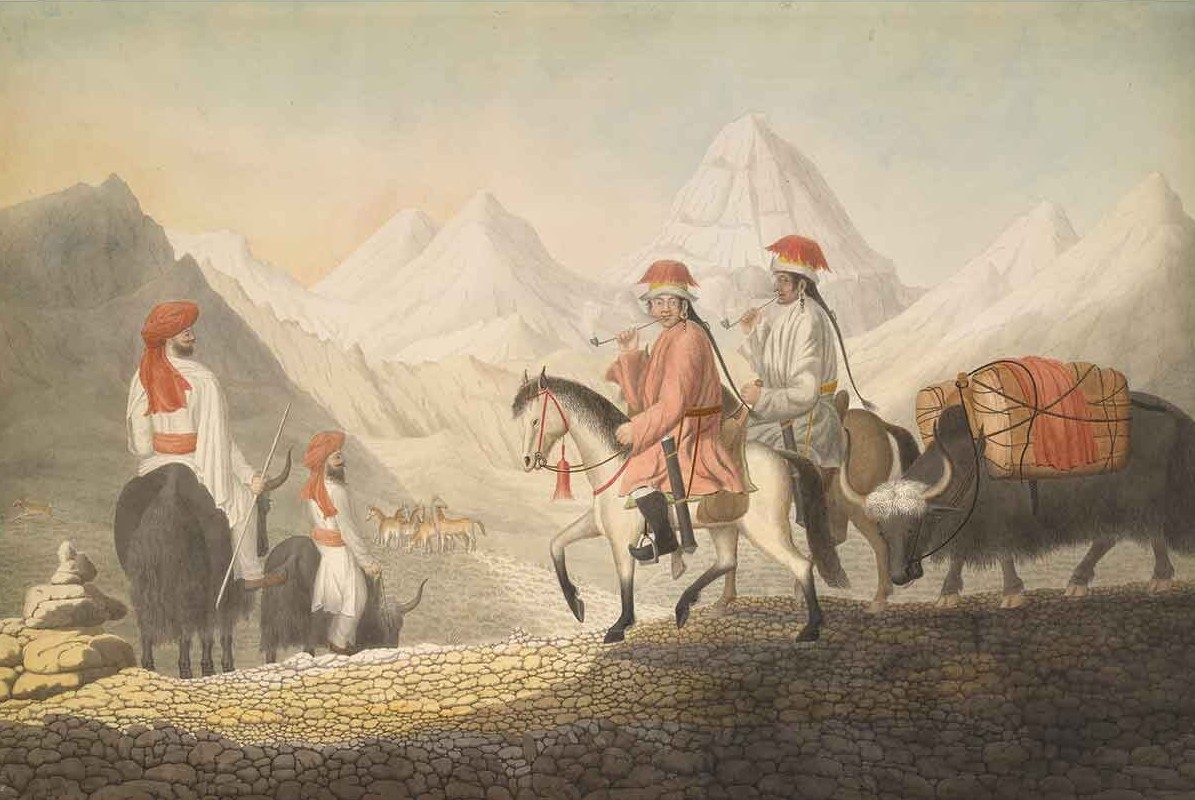
William Moorcroft and Hyder Young Hearsey on yaks (left) with two Chinese horsemen near Lake Manasarovar, Tibet, July 1812. Moorcroft is the namesake of this species.

Sixty-seven species of Aquilegia were identified in Philip A. Munz's 1946 Aquilegia: The Cultivated and Wild Columbines, which is considered the principal authority on the genus. Later authorities on Aquilegia show little consensus regarding the number of species, subspecies, and varieties. Aquilegia moorcroftiana was first described by British botanist John Forbes Royle in 1834 in his book Illustrations of the Botany and Other Branches of the Natural History of the Himalayan Mountains and of the Flora of Cashmere. The type locality is at Ladakh in Kashmir.

As of 2003, the Flora Iranica made reference to three species of Aquilegia that were described as "Species nova ex affinitate remota Aquilegia moorcroftiana": Aquilegia gracillima, Aquilegia maimanica, and Aquilegia microcentra. The botanist Robert Nold noted in 2003 that political circumstances meant that the species would "probably remain nothing but names for years to come". Nold mentioned them within the species A. moorcroftiana, saying that he hoped "that A. moorcroftiana is more polymorphic than anyone suspects".

A dwarf variety known as A. moorcroftiana var. afghanica is found in the western portion of the range. This variety, sometimes referred to as ''A. afghanica, is more pubescent. While the flowers are generally coloured identically to the standard variety, they are morphologically distinct. The type locality is in the Kurram Valley of Pakistan.

=== Etymology ===
The species is named after William Moorcroft, a British mountaineer and explorer of Ladakh and Tibet.

== Distribution ==
The native range of A. moorcroftiana is found in central Asia, spanning Afghanistan, Tajikistan, Pakistan, Kashmir, Nepal, and Tibet. A. moorcroftiana grows at the highest elevation of any species of columbine, with examples frequently found in both open terrain and among shrubs at over 4,000 metres (13,000 ft) of elevation.

A. moorcroftiana is thought to be the most common species of Aquilegia in the southwestern portion of the Karakoram mountains.

== Cultivation ==
In 1852, A. moorcroftiana was introduced as a cultivated species in English gardens. Munz reported in 1946 that it remained "very sparingly listed" in nurseries, with Munz noting that at least one cultivated plant advertised as Aquilegia glandulosa appearing more similar to A. moorcroftiana.

Cultivation of the plant in the United States was noted by Nold in 2003, who observed occasional transfer of seeds through rock garden seed exchanges and the return of collectors bringing back seeds from the Himalayas.
