= BEX4 =

Mammalian protein found in humans

Identifiers
- Aliases: BEX4, BEXL1, brain expressed X-linked 4
- External IDs: OMIM: 300692; MGI: 3606746; GeneCards: BEX4

Gene location (Human)
Chr.	X chromosome (human)
Band	Xq22.1	Start	103,215,108 bp
Band	Xq22.1	End	103,217,246 bp

Gene location (Mouse)
Chr.	X chromosome (mouse)
Band	X F1|X	Start	135,039,745 bp
Band	X F1|X	End	135,041,192 bp
RNA expression pattern
Bgee	Human / Mouse (ortholog); Top expressed in: prefrontal cortex; Brodmann area 9; frontal pole; nucleus accumbens; C1 segment; hypothalamus; caudate nucleus; pons; amygdala; right frontal lobe / Top expressed in: yolk sac; epiblast; ovary; embryo; ventricular zone; lens; mesencephalon; neural tube; embryo; islet of Langerhans; More reference expression data
BioGPS	n/a
Gene ontology
Molecular function	histone deacetylase binding; alpha-tubulin binding
Cellular component	nucleus; cytoplasm; microtubule; spindle pole; cytoskeleton
Biological process	chromosome segregation; regulation of cell migration; regulation of cell population proliferation; negative regulation of tubulin deacetylation
Sources:Amigo / QuickGO
Orthologs
Databases	NCBI: entry; OMA: entry
Species	Human	Mouse
Entrez	56271	406217
Ensembl	ENSG00000102409	ENSMUSG00000047844
UniProt	Q9NWD9	Q9CWT2
RefSeq (mRNA)	NM_001127688; NM_001080425	NM_212457; NM_001359569; NM_001359570
RefSeq (protein)	NP_001073894; NP_001121160	NP_997622; NP_001346498; NP_001346499
Location (UCSC)	Chr X: 103.22 – 103.22 Mb	Chr X: 135.04 – 135.04 Mb
PubMed search
- Wikidata
View/Edit Human	View/Edit Mouse

Brain expressed, X-linked 4 is a protein that in humans is encoded by the BEX4 gene.

This gene is a member of the brain expressed X-linked gene family. Proteins encoded by other members of this family act as transcription elongation factors that allow RNA polymerase II to escape pausing during elongation. Multiple alternatively spliced variants encoding the same protein have been identified.
