= List of birds of Iran =

This is a list of the bird species recorded in Iran. The avifauna of Iran include a total of 573 species, of which two are endemic, and 4 have been introduced by humans.

This list's taxonomic treatment (designation and sequence of orders, families and species) and nomenclature (common and scientific names) follow the conventions of The Clements Checklist of Birds of the World, 2022 edition. The family accounts at the beginning of each heading reflect this taxonomy, as do the species counts found in each family account. Introduced and accidental species are included in the total counts for Iran.

The following tags have been used to highlight several categories. The commonly occurring native species do not fall into any of these categories.

- (A) Accidental - a species that rarely or accidentally occurs in Iran
- (E) Endemic - a species endemic to Iran
- (I) Introduced - a species introduced to Iran as a consequence, direct or indirect, of human actions
- (Ex) Extirpated - a species that no longer occurs in Iran although populations exist elsewhere

== Ducks, geese, and waterfowl ==
Order: Anseriformes Family: Anatidae

Anatidae includes the ducks and most duck-like waterfowl, such as geese and swans. These birds are adapted to an aquatic existence with webbed feet, flattened bills, and feathers that are excellent at shedding water due to an oily coating.

- Lesser whistling-duck, Dendrocygna javanica (A)
- Graylag goose, Anser anser
- Greater white-fronted goose, Anser albifrons
- Lesser white-fronted goose, Anser erythropus (A)
- Taiga bean-goose, Anser fabalis (A)
- Brant, Branta bernicla (A)
- Barnacle goose, Branta leucopsis (A)
- Cackling goose, Branta hutchinsii (A)
- Red-breasted goose, Branta ruficollis (A)
- Snow goose, Chen caerulescens
- Black swan, Cygnus atratus
- Mute swan, Cygnus olor
- Tundra swan, Cygnus columbianus
- Whooper swan, Cygnus cygnus
- Ruddy shelduck, Tadorna ferruginea
- Common shelduck, Tadorna tadorna
- Cotton pygmy-goose, Nettapus coromandelianus (A)
- Garganey, Spatula querquedula
- Northern shoveler, Spatula clypeata
- Gadwall, Mareca strepera
- Falcated duck, Mareca falcata
- Eurasian wigeon, Mareca penelope
- Mallard, Anas platyrhynchos
- Northern pintail, Anas acuta
- Green-winged teal, Anas crecca
- Marbled teal, Marmaronetta angustirostris
- Red-crested pochard, Netta rufina
- Common pochard, Aythya ferina
- Ferruginous duck, Aythya nyroca
- Tufted duck, Aythya fuligula
- Greater scaup, Aythya marila
- Velvet scoter, Melanitta fusca (A)
- Common scoter, Melanitta nigra (A)
- Long-tailed duck, Clangula hyemalis (A)
- Common goldeneye, Bucephala clangula
- Smew, Mergellus albellus
- Common merganser, Mergus merganser
- Red-breasted merganser, Mergus serrator
- Ruddy duck, Oxyura jamaicensis (I)
- White-headed duck, Oxyura leucocephala

== Pheasants, grouse, and allies ==
Order: Galliformes Family: Phasianidae

The Phasianidae are a family of terrestrial birds. In general, they are plump (although they vary in size) and have broad, relatively short wings.

- See-see partridge, Ammoperdix griseogularis
- Common quail, Coturnix coturnix
- Chukar, Alectoris chukar
- Caspian snowcock, Tetraogallus caspius
- Black francolin, Francolinus francolinus
- Gray francolin, Ortygornis pondicerianus
- Ring-necked pheasant, Phasianus colchicus
- Green pheasant, Phasianus versicolor
- Gray partridge, Perdix perdix
- Caucasian grouse, Lyrurus mlokosiewiczi

== Flamingos ==
Order: Phoenicopteriformes Family: Phoenicopteridae

Flamingos are gregarious wading birds, usually 3 to 5 feet (0.9 to 1.5 m) tall, found in both the Western and Eastern Hemispheres. Flamingos filter-feed on shellfish and algae. Their oddly shaped beaks are specially adapted to separate mud and silt from the food they consume and, uniquely, are used upside-down.

- Greater flamingo, Phoenicopterus roseus
- Lesser flamingo, Phoenicopterus minor

== Grebes ==
Order: Podicipediformes Family: Podicipedidae

Grebes are small to medium-large freshwater diving birds. They have lobed toes and are excellent swimmers and divers. However, they have their feet placed far back on the body, making them quite ungainly on land.

- Little grebe, Tachybaptus ruficollis
- Horned grebe, Podiceps auritus
- Red-necked grebe, Podiceps grisegena
- Great crested grebe, Podiceps cristatus
- Eared grebe, Podiceps nigricollis

== Pigeons and doves ==
Order: Columbiformes Family: Columbidae

Pigeons and doves are stout-bodied birds with short necks and short slender bills with a fleshy cere.

- Rock pigeon, Columba livia
- Stock dove, Columba oenas
- Yellow-eyed pigeon, Columba eversmanni (A)
- Common wood-pigeon, Columba palumbus
- European turtle-dove, Streptopelia turtur
- Oriental turtle-dove, Streptopelia orientalis (A)
- Eurasian collared-dove, Streptopelia decaocto
- Red collared-dove, Streptopelia tranquebarica (A)
- Laughing dove, Spilopelia senegalensis

== Sandgrouse ==
Order: Pterocliformes Family: Pteroclidae

Sandgrouse have small, pigeon like heads and necks, but sturdy compact bodies. They have long pointed wings and sometimes tails and a fast direct flight. Flocks fly to watering holes at dawn and dusk. Their legs are feathered down to the toes.

- Pallas's sandgrouse, Syrrhaptes paradoxus (A)
- Pin-tailed sandgrouse, Pterocles alchata
- Chestnut-bellied sandgrouse, Pterocles exustus
- Spotted sandgrouse, Pterocles senegallus
- Black-bellied sandgrouse, Pterocles orientalis
- Crowned sandgrouse, Pterocles coronatus
- Lichtenstein's sandgrouse, Pterocles lichtensteinii

== Bustards ==
Order: Otidiformes Family: Otididae

Bustards are large terrestrial birds mainly associated with dry open country and steppes in the Old World. They are omnivorous and nest on the ground. They walk steadily on strong legs and big toes, pecking for food as they go. They have long broad wings with "fingered" wingtips and striking patterns in flight. Many have interesting mating displays.

- Great bustard, Otis tarda
- MacQueen's bustard, Chlamydotis macqueenii
- Little bustard, Tetrax tetrax

== Cuckoos ==
Order: Cuculiformes Family: Cuculidae

The family Cuculidae includes cuckoos, roadrunners and anis. These birds are of variable size with slender bodies, long tails and strong legs. The Old World cuckoos are brood parasites.

- Great spotted cuckoo, Clamator glandarius (A)
- Pied cuckoo, Clamator jacobinus (A)
- Asian koel, Eudynamys scolopaceus (A)
- Common cuckoo, Cuculus canorus
- Oriental cuckoo, Cuculus optatus (A)

== Nightjars and allies ==
Order: Caprimulgiformes Family: Caprimulgidae

Nightjars are medium-sized nocturnal birds that usually nest on the ground. They have long wings, short legs and very short bills. Most have small feet, of little use for walking, and long pointed wings. Their soft plumage is camouflaged to resemble bark or leaves.

- Indian nightjar, Caprimulgus asiaticus
- Eurasian nightjar, Caprimulgus europaeus
- Egyptian nightjar, Caprimulgus aegyptius
- Sykes's nightjar, Caprimulgus mahrattensis (A)
- Nubian nightjar, Caprimulgus nubicus

== Swifts ==
Order: Caprimulgiformes Family: Apodidae

Swifts are small birds which spend the majority of their lives flying. These birds have very short legs and never settle voluntarily on the ground, perching instead only on vertical surfaces. Many swifts have long swept-back wings which resemble a crescent or boomerang.

- Alpine swift, Apus melba
- Common swift, Apus apus
- Pacific swift, Apus pacificus
- Pallid swift, Apus pallidus
- Little swift, Apus affinis

== Rails, gallinules, and coots ==
Order: Gruiformes Family: Rallidae

Rallidae is a large family of small to medium-sized birds which includes the rails, crakes, coots and gallinules. Typically they inhabit dense vegetation in damp environments near lakes, swamps or rivers. In general they are shy and secretive birds, making them difficult to observe. Most species have strong legs and long toes which are well adapted to soft uneven surfaces. They tend to have short, rounded wings and to be weak fliers.

- Water rail, Rallus aquaticus
- Corn crake, Crex crex
- Spotted crake, Porzana porzana
- Eurasian moorhen, Gallinula chloropus
- Eurasian coot, Fulica atra
- Gray-headed swamphen, Porphyrio poliocephalus
- Western swamphen, Porphyrio porphyrio
- White-breasted waterhen, Amaurornis phoenicurus (A)
- Little crake, Zapornia parva
- Baillon's crake, Zapornia pusilla

== Cranes ==
Order: Gruiformes Family: Gruidae

Cranes are large, long-legged and long-necked birds. Unlike the similar-looking but unrelated herons, cranes fly with necks outstretched, not pulled back. Most have elaborate and noisy courting displays or "dances".

- Demoiselle crane, Anthropoides virgo (A)
- Siberian crane, Leucogeranus leucogeranus (A)
- Common crane, Grus grus

== Thick-knees ==
Order: Charadriiformes Family: Burhinidae

The thick-knees are a group of largely tropical waders in the family Burhinidae. They are found worldwide within the tropical zone, with some species also breeding in temperate Europe and Australia. They are medium to large waders with strong black or yellow-black bills, large yellow eyes and cryptic plumage. Despite being classed as waders, most species have a preference for arid or semi-arid habitats.

- Indian thick-knee, Burhinus indicus
- Eurasian thick-knee, Burhinus oedicnemus
- Great thick-knee, Esacus recurvirostris

== Stilts and avocets ==
Order: Charadriiformes Family: Recurvirostridae

Recurvirostridae is a family of large wading birds, which includes the avocets and stilts. The avocets have long legs and long up-curved bills. The stilts have extremely long legs and long, thin, straight bills.

- Black-winged stilt, Himantopus himantopus
- Pied avocet, Recurvirostra avosetta

== Oystercatchers ==
Order: Charadriiformes Family: Haematopodidae

The oystercatchers are large and noisy plover-like birds, with strong bills used for smashing or prising open molluscs.

- Eurasian oystercatcher, Haematopus ostralegus

== Plovers and lapwings ==
Order: Charadriiformes Family: Charadriidae

The family Charadriidae includes the plovers, dotterels and lapwings. They are small to medium-sized birds with compact bodies, short, thick necks and long, usually pointed, wings. They are found in open country worldwide, mostly in habitats near water.

- Black-bellied plover, Pluvialis squatarola
- European golden-plover, Pluvialis apricaria
- Pacific golden-plover, Pluvialis fulva (A)
- Northern lapwing, Vanellus vanellus
- Spur-winged plover, Vanellus spinosus (A)
- Gray-headed lapwing, Vanellus cinereus (A)
- Red-wattled lapwing, Vanellus indicus
- Sociable lapwing, Vanellus gregarius (A)
- White-tailed lapwing, Vanellus leucurus
- Lesser sand-plover, Charadrius mongolus
- Greater sand-plover, Charadrius leschenaultii
- Caspian plover, Charadrius asiaticus
- Kentish plover, Charadrius alexandrinus
- Common ringed plover, Charadrius hiaticula
- Little ringed plover, Charadrius dubius
- Eurasian dotterel, Charadrius morinellus

== Painted-snipes ==
Order: Charadriiformes Family: Rostratulidae

Painted-snipes are short-legged, long-billed birds similar in shape to true snipes, but more brightly colored.

- Greater painted-snipe, Rostratula benghalensis (A)

== Jacanas ==
Order: Charadriiformes Family: Jacanidae

The jacanas are a family of waders which are found throughout the tropics. They are identifiable by their huge feet and claws which enable them to walk on floating vegetation in the shallow lakes that are their preferred habitat.

- Pheasant-tailed jacana, Hydrophasianus chirurgus (A)

== Sandpipers and allies ==
Order: Charadriiformes Family: Scolopacidae

Scolopacidae is a large diverse family of small to medium-sized shorebirds including the sandpipers, curlews, godwits, shanks, tattlers, woodcocks, snipes, dowitchers and phalaropes. The majority of these species eat small invertebrates picked out of the mud or soil. Variation in length of legs and bills enables multiple species to feed in the same habitat, particularly on the coast, without direct competition for food. There are 36 species which have been recorded in Iran.

- Whimbrel, Numenius phaeopus
- Far Eastern curlew, Numenius madagascariensis (A)
- Slender-billed curlew, Numenius tenuirostris (A)
- Eurasian curlew, Numenius arquata
- Bar-tailed godwit, Limosa lapponica
- Black-tailed godwit, Limosa limosa
- Ruddy turnstone, Arenaria interpres
- Great knot, Calidris tenuirostris
- Red knot, Calidris canutus (A)
- Ruff, Calidris pugnax
- Broad-billed sandpiper, Calidris falcinellus
- Curlew sandpiper, Calidris ferruginea
- Long-toed stint, Calidris subminuta
- Temminck's stint, Calidris temminckii
- Red-necked stint, Calidris ruficollis (A)
- Sanderling, Calidris alba
- Dunlin, Calidris alpina
- Little stint, Calidris minuta
- Pectoral sandpiper, Calidris melanotos (A)
- Long-billed dowitcher, Limnodromus scolopaceus
- Jack snipe, Lymnocryptes minimus
- Eurasian woodcock, Scolopax rusticola
- Solitary snipe, Gallinago solitaria (A)
- Great snipe, Gallinago media (A)
- Common snipe, Gallinago gallinago
- Pin-tailed snipe, Gallinago stenura (A)
- Terek sandpiper, Xenus cinereus
- Red-necked phalarope, Phalaropus lobatus
- Red phalarope, Phalaropus fulicarius (A)
- Wilson's phalarope, Phalaropus tricolor
- Common sandpiper, Actitis hypoleucos
- Green sandpiper, Tringa ochropus
- Spotted redshank, Tringa erythropus
- Common greenshank, Tringa nebularia
- Marsh sandpiper, Tringa stagnatilis
- Wood sandpiper, Tringa glareola
- Common redshank, Tringa totanus

== Buttonquail ==
Order: Charadriiformes Family: Turnicidae

The buttonquail are small, drab, running birds which resemble the true quails. The female is the brighter of the sexes and initiates courtship. The male incubates the eggs and tends the young.

- Small buttonquail, Turnix sylvaticus (A)

== Crab-plover ==
Order: Charadriiformes Family: Dromadidae

The crab-plover is related to the waders. It resembles a plover but with very long grey legs and a strong heavy black bill similar to a tern. It has black-and-white plumage, a long neck, partially webbed feet and a bill designed for eating crabs.

- Crab plover, Dromas ardeola

== Pratincoles and coursers ==
Order: Charadriiformes Family: Glareolidae

Glareolidae is a family of wading birds comprising the pratincoles, which have short legs, long pointed wings and long forked tails, and the coursers, which have long legs, short wings and long, pointed bills which curve downwards.

- Cream-colored courser, Cursorius cursor
- Collared pratincole, Glareola pratincola
- Oriental pratincole, Glareola maldivarum (A)
- Black-winged pratincole, Glareola nordmanni (A)
- Small pratincole, Glareola lactea (A)

== Skuas and jaegers ==
Order: Charadriiformes Family: Stercorariidae

The family Stercorariidae are, in general, medium to large birds, typically with grey or brown plumage, often with white markings on the wings. They nest on the ground in temperate and arctic regions and are long-distance migrants.

- Brown skua, Stercorarius antarcticus (A)
- Pomarine jaeger, Stercorarius pomarinus
- Parasitic jaeger, Stercorarius parasiticus
- Long-tailed jaeger, Stercorarius longicaudus (A)

== Gulls, terns, and skimmers ==
Order: Charadriiformes Family: Laridae

Laridae is a family of medium to large seabirds, the gulls, terns, and skimmers. Gulls are typically grey or white, often with black markings on the head or wings. They have stout, longish bills and webbed feet. Terns are a group of generally medium to large seabirds typically with grey or white plumage, often with black markings on the head. Most terns hunt fish by diving but some pick insects off the surface of fresh water. Terns are generally long-lived birds, with several species known to live in excess of 30 years. Skimmers are a small family of tropical tern-like birds. They have an elongated lower mandible which they use to feed by flying low over the water surface and skimming the water for small fish.

- Black-legged kittiwake, Rissa tridactyla (A)
- Slender-billed gull, Chroicocephalus genei
- Black-headed gull, Chroicocephalus ridibundus (A)
- Brown-headed gull, Chroicocephalus brunnicephalus (A)
- Little gull, Hydrocoloeus minutus
- Mediterranean gull, Ichthyaetus melanocephalus (A)
- White-eyed gull, Ichthyaetus leucophthalmus (A)
- Sooty gull, Ichthyaetus hemprichii
- Pallas's gull, Ichthyaetus ichthyaetus
- Common gull, Larus canus
- Herring gull, Larus argentatus (A)
- Caspian gull, Larus cachinnans
- Armenian gull, Larus armenicus
- Lesser black-backed gull, Larus fuscus
- Glaucous gull, Larus hyperboreus (A)
- American herring gull, Larus smithsonianus
- Vega gull, Larus vegae
- Great black-backed gull, Larus marinus (A)
- Heuglin's gull, Larus heuglini
- Yellow-legged gull, Larus michahellis
- Sabine's gull, Xema sabini
- Brown noddy, Anous stolidus (A)
- Sooty tern, Onychoprion fuscatus (A)
- Bridled tern, Onychoprion anaethetus
- Roseate tern, Sterna dougallii
- Black-naped tern, Sterna sumatrana
- Arctic tern, Sterna paradisaea
- Little tern, Sternula albifrons
- Saunders's tern, Sternula saundersi
- Gull-billed tern, Gelochelidon nilotica
- Caspian tern, Hydroprogne caspia
- Black tern, Chlidonias niger
- White-winged tern, Chlidonias leucopterus
- Whiskered tern, Chlidonias hybrida
- Common tern, Sterna hirundo
- River tern, Sterna aurantia (A)
- White-cheeked tern, Sterna repressa
- Great crested tern, Thalasseus bergii
- Sandwich tern, Thalasseus sandvicensis
- Lesser crested tern, Thalasseus bengalensis
- Indian skimmer, Rynchops albicollis (A)

== Tropicbirds ==
Order: Phaethontiformes Family: Phaethontidae

Tropicbirds are slender white birds of tropical oceans, with exceptionally long central tail feathers. Their heads and long wings have black markings.

- Red-billed tropicbird, Phaethon aethereus (A)

== Loons ==
Order: Gaviiformes Family: Gaviidae

Loons, known as divers in Europe, are a group of aquatic birds found in many parts of North America and northern Europe. They are the size of a large duck or small goose, which they somewhat resemble when swimming, but to which they are completely unrelated.

- Red-throated loon, Gavia stellata (A)
- Arctic loon, Gavia arctica (A)

== Southern storm-petrels ==
Order: Procellariiformes Family: Oceanitidae

The southern storm-petrels are relatives of the petrels and are the smallest seabirds. They feed on planktonic crustaceans and small fish picked from the surface, typically while hovering. The flight is fluttering and sometimes bat-like.

- Black-bellied storm-petrel, Fregetta tropica
- White-bellied storm-petrel, Fregetta grallaria
- Wilson's storm-petrel, Oceanites oceanicus (A)

== Shearwaters and petrels ==
Order: Procellariiformes Family: Procellariidae

The procellariids are the main group of medium-sized "true petrels", characterised by united nostrils with medium septum and a long outer functional primary.

- Jouanin's petrel, Bulweria fallax
- Bulwer's petrel, Bulweria bulwerii
- Cory's shearwater, Calonectris borealis
- Flesh-footed shearwater, Ardenna carneipes
- Wedge-tailed shearwater, Ardenna pacifica (A)
- Sooty shearwater, Ardenna grisea (A)
- Tropical shearwater, Ardenna bailoni
- Persian shearwater, Puffinus persicus (A)
- Little shearwater, Puffinus assimilis
- Subantarctic shearwater, Puffinus elegans

== Storks ==
Order: Ciconiiformes Family: Ciconiidae

Storks are large, long-legged, long-necked, wading birds with long, stout bills. Storks are mute, but bill-clattering is an important mode of communication at the nest. Their nests can be large and may be reused for many years. Many species are migratory.

- Black stork, Ciconia nigra
- Asian woolly-necked stork, Ciconia episcopus (A)
- White stork, Ciconia ciconia

== Boobies and gannets ==
Order: Suliformes Family: Sulidae

The sulids comprise the gannets and boobies. Both groups are medium to large coastal seabirds that plunge-dive for fish.

- Masked booby, Sula dactylatra (A)
- Red-footed booby, Sula sula (A)

== Anhingas ==
Order: Suliformes Family: Anhingidae

Anhingas or darters are often called "snake-birds" because of their long thin neck, which gives a snake-like appearance when they swim with their bodies submerged. The males have black and dark-brown plumage, an erectile crest on the nape and a larger bill than the female. The females have much paler plumage especially on the neck and underparts. The darters have completely webbed feet and their legs are short and set far back on the body. Their plumage is somewhat permeable, like that of cormorants, and they spread their wings to dry after diving.

- African darter, Anhinga rufa
- Oriental darter, Anhinga melanogaster

== Cormorants and Shags ==
Order: Suliformes Family: Phalacrocoracidae

Phalacrocoracidae is a family of medium to large coastal, fish-eating seabirds that includes cormorants and shags. Plumage colouration varies, with the majority having mainly dark plumage, some species being black-and-white and a few being colourful.

- Little cormorant, Microcarbo niger
- Pygmy cormorant, Microcarbo pygmeus
- European shag, Gulosus aristotelis
- Great cormorant, Phalacrocorax carbo
- Indian cormorant, Phalacrocorax fuscicollis
- Socotra cormorant, Phalacrocorax nigrogularis

== Pelicans ==
Order: Pelecaniformes Family: Pelecanidae

Pelicans are large water birds with a distinctive pouch under their beak. As with other members of the order Pelecaniformes, they have webbed feet with four toes.

- Great white pelican, Pelecanus onocrotalus
- Dalmatian pelican, Pelecanus crispus

== Herons, egrets, and bitterns ==
Order: Pelecaniformes Family: Ardeidae

The family Ardeidae contains the bitterns, herons and egrets. Herons and egrets are medium to large wading birds with long necks and legs. Bitterns tend to be shorter necked and more wary. Members of Ardeidae fly with their necks retracted, unlike other long-necked birds such as storks, ibises and spoonbills.

- Great bittern, Botaurus stellaris
- Little bittern, Ixobrychus minutus
- Gray heron, Ardea cinerea
- Goliath heron, Ardea goliath
- Purple heron, Ardea purpurea
- Great egret, Ardea alba
- Intermediate egret, Ardea intermedia
- Little egret, Egretta garzetta
- Western reef-heron, Egretta gularis
- Eastern cattle egret, Bubulcus coromandus
- Cattle egret, Bubulcus ibis
- Squacco heron, Ardeola ralloides
- Indian pond-heron, Ardeola grayii
- Striated heron, Butorides striata
- Black-crowned night-heron, Nycticorax nycticorax

== Ibises and spoonbills ==
Order: Pelecaniformes Family: Threskiornithidae

Threskiornithidae is a family of large terrestrial and wading birds which includes the ibises and spoonbills. They have long, broad wings with 11 primary and about 20 secondary feathers. They are strong fliers and despite their size and weight, very capable soarers.

- Glossy ibis, Plegadis falcinellus
- African sacred ibis, Threskiornis aethiopicus
- Eurasian spoonbill, Platalea leucorodia

== Osprey ==
Order: Accipitriformes Family: Pandionidae

The family Pandionidae contains only one species, the osprey. The osprey is a medium-large raptor which is a specialist fish-eater with a worldwide distribution.

- Osprey, Pandion haliaetus

== Hawks, eagles, and kites ==
Order: Accipitriformes Family: Accipitridae

Accipitridae is a family of birds of prey, which includes hawks, eagles, kites, harriers and Old World vultures. These birds have powerful hooked beaks for tearing flesh from their prey, strong legs, powerful talons and keen eyesight.

- Black-winged kite, Elanus caeruleus
- Bearded vulture, Gypaetus barbatus
- Egyptian vulture, Neophron percnopterus
- European honey-buzzard, Pernis apivorus
- Oriental honey-buzzard, Pernis ptilorhynchus
- Cinereous vulture, Aegypius monachus
- White-rumped vulture, Gyps himalayensis (A)
- Himalayan griffon, Gyps fulvus (A)
- Eurasian griffon, Gyps fulvus
- Red-headed vulture, Sarcogyps calvus
- Short-toed snake-eagle, Circaetus gallicus
- Lesser spotted eagle, Clanga pomarina
- Greater spotted eagle, Clanga clanga
- Booted eagle, Hieraaetus pennatus
- Tawny eagle, Aquila rapax (A)
- Steppe eagle, Aquila nipalensis
- Imperial eagle, Aquila heliaca
- Golden eagle, Aquila chrysaetos
- Bonelli's eagle, Aquila fasciata
- White-eyed buzzard, Butastur teesa (A)
- Eurasian marsh-harrier, Circus aeruginosus
- Eastern marsh-harrier, Circus spilonotus (A)
- Hen harrier, Circus cyaneus
- Pallid harrier, Circus macrourus
- Montagu's harrier, Circus pygargus
- Shikra, Accipiter badius
- Levant sparrowhawk, Accipiter brevipes
- Eurasian sparrowhawk, Accipiter nisus
- Northern goshawk, Accipiter gentilis
- Crested goshawk, Accipiter trivirgatus
- Eurasian buzzard, Buteo buteo
- Red kite, Milvus milvus (A)
- Black kite, Milvus migrans
- Brahminy kite, Haliastur indus
- White-tailed eagle, Haliaeetus albicilla
- Pallas's fish eagle, Haliaeetus leucoryphus (A)
- Rough-legged hawk, Buteo lagopus (A)
- Common buzzard, Buteo buteo
- Long-legged buzzard, Buteo rufinus
- Upland buzzard, Buteo hemilasius (A)

== Barn-owls ==
Order: Strigiformes Family: Tytonidae

Barn-owls are medium to large owls with large heads and characteristic heart-shaped faces. They have long strong legs with powerful talons.

- Western barn owl, Tyto alba

== Owls ==
Order: Strigiformes Family: Strigidae

The typical owls are small to large solitary nocturnal birds of prey. They have large forward-facing eyes and ears, a hawk-like beak and a conspicuous circle of feathers around each eye called a facial disk.

- Indian scops owl, Otus bakkamoena
- Eurasian scops-owl, Otus scops
- Pallid scops-owl, Otus brucei (A)
- Oriental scops owl, Otus bakkamoena (A)
- Eurasian eagle-owl, Bubo bubo (A)
- Pharaoh eagle-owl, Bubo ascalaphus (A)
- Snowy owl, Bubo scandiacus (A)
- Brown fish-owl, Ketupa zeylonensis (A)
- Spotted owlet, Athene brama
- Little owl, Athene noctua
- Tawny owl, Strix aluco
- Desert owl, Strix hadorami (A)
- Omani owl, Strix butleri (A)
- Long-eared owl, Asio otus
- Short-eared owl, Asio flammeus
- Boreal owl, Aegolius funereus (A)

== Hoopoes ==
Order: Bucerotiformes Family: Upupidae

Hoopoes have black, white and orangey-pink colouring with a large erectile crest on their head.

- Eurasian hoopoe, Upupa epops

== Kingfishers ==
Order: Coraciiformes Family: Alcedinidae

Kingfishers are medium-sized birds with large heads, long, pointed bills, short legs and stubby tails.

- Common kingfisher, Alcedo atthis
- White-throated kingfisher, Halcyon smyrnensis
- Pied kingfisher, Ceryle rudis

== Bee-eaters ==
Order: Coraciiformes Family: Meropidae

The bee-eaters are a group of near passerine birds in the family Meropidae. Most species are found in Africa but others occur in southern Europe, Madagascar, Australia and New Guinea. They are characterised by richly coloured plumage, slender bodies and usually elongated central tail feathers. All are colourful and have long downturned bills and pointed wings, which give them a swallow-like appearance when seen from afar.

- Asian green bee-eater, Merops orientalis
- Blue-cheeked bee-eater, Merops persicus
- European bee-eater, Merops apiaster

== Rollers ==
Order: Coraciiformes Family: Coraciidae

Rollers resemble crows in size and build, but are more closely related to the kingfishers and bee-eaters. They share the colourful appearance of those groups with blues and browns predominating. The two inner front toes are connected, but the outer toe is not.

- European roller, Coracias garrulus
- Indian roller, Coracias benghalensis

== Woodpeckers ==
Order: Piciformes Family: Picidae

Woodpeckers are small to medium-sized birds with chisel-like beaks, short legs, stiff tails and long tongues used for capturing insects. Some species have feet with two toes pointing forward and two backward, while several species have only three toes. Many woodpeckers have the habit of tapping noisily on tree trunks with their beaks.

- Eurasian wryneck, Jynx torquilla
- Middle spotted woodpecker, Dendrocoptes medius
- Great spotted woodpecker, Dendrocopos major
- White-backed woodpecker, Dendrocopos leucotos
- White-winged woodpecker, Dendrocopos leucopterus (A)
- Syrian woodpecker, Dendrocopos syriacus
- Sind woodpecker, Dendrocopos assimilis
- Lesser spotted woodpecker, Dryobates minor
- Scaly-bellied woodpecker, Picus squamatus (A)
- Grey-headed woodpecker, Picus canus
- Eurasian green woodpecker, Picus viridis
- Black woodpecker, Dryocopus martius
- Greater yellownape, chrysophlegma flavinucha

== Falcons and caracaras ==
Order: Falconiformes Family: Falconidae

Falconidae is a family of diurnal birds of prey. They differ from hawks, eagles and kites in that they kill with their beaks instead of their talons.

- Lesser kestrel, Falco naumanni
- Eurasian kestrel, Falco tinnunculus
- Red-necked falcon, Falco chicquera (A)
- Red-footed falcon, Falco vespertinus (A)
- Amur falcon, Falco amurensis (A)
- Sooty falcon, Falco concolor
- Merlin, Falco columbarius
- Eurasian hobby, Falco subbuteo
- Lanner falcon, Falco biarmicus (A)
- Laggar falcon, Falco jugger (A)
- Saker falcon, Falco cherrug
- Peregrine falcon, Falco peregrinus
- Gyrfalcon, Falco rusticolus

== Old World parrots ==
Order: Psittaciformes Family: Psittaculidae

Characteristic features of parrots include a strong curved bill, an upright stance, strong legs, and clawed zygodactyl feet. Many parrots are vividly coloured, and some are multi-coloured. In size they range from 8 cm (3.1 in) to 1 m (3.3 ft) in length. Old World parrots are found from Africa east across south and southeast Asia and Oceania to Australia and New Zealand.

- Alexandrine parakeet, Psittacula eupatria (I)
- Rose-ringed parakeet, Psittacula krameri (I)

== Old World orioles ==
Order: Passeriformes Family: Oriolidae

The Old World orioles are colourful passerine birds. They are not related to the New World orioles.

- Eurasian golden oriole, Oriolus oriolus
- Indian golden oriole, Oriolus kundoo
- Black-naped oriole, Oriolus chinensis (A)

== Drongos ==
Order: Passeriformes Family: Dicruridae

The drongos are mostly black or dark grey in colour, sometimes with metallic tints. They have long forked tails, and some Asian species have elaborate tail decorations. They have short legs and sit very upright when perched, like a shrike. They flycatch or take prey from the ground.

- Black drongo, Dicrurus macrocercus (A)
- Ashy drongo, Dicrurus leucophaeus (A)

== Monarch flycatchers ==
Order: Passeriformes Family: Monarchidae

The monarch flycatchers are small to medium-sized insectivorous passerines which hunt by flycatching.

- Black-naped monarch, Hypothymis azurea (A)
- Indian paradise flycatcher, Terpsiphone paradisi (A)

== Shrikes ==
Order: Passeriformes Family: Laniidae

Shrikes are passerine birds known for their habit of catching other birds and small animals and impaling the uneaten portions of their bodies on thorns. A typical shrike's beak is hooked, like a bird of prey.

- Red-backed shrike, Lanius collurio
- Red-tailed shrike, Lanius phoenicuroides
- Isabelline shrike, Lanius isabellinus
- Brown shrike, Lanius cristatus (A)
- Bay-backed shrike, Lanius vittatus
- Long-tailed shrike, Lanius schach (A)
- Great gray shrike, Lanius excubitor
- Iberian grey shrike, Lanius meridionalis
- Lesser gray shrike, Lanius minor
- Masked shrike, Lanius nubicus
- Woodchat shrike, Lanius senator

== Crows, jays, and magpies ==
Order: Passeriformes Family: Corvidae

The family Corvidae includes crows, ravens, jays, choughs, magpies, treepies, nutcrackers and ground jays. Corvids are above average in size among the Passeriformes, and some of the larger species show high levels of intelligence.

- Eurasian jay, Garrulus glandarius
- Eurasian magpie, Pica pica
- Turkestan ground-jay, Podoces panderi
- Iranian ground-jay, Podoces pleskei (E)
- Eurasian nutcracker, Nucifraga caryocatactes (A)
- Red-billed chough, Pyrrhocorax pyrrhocorax
- Yellow-billed chough, Pyrrhocorax graculus
- Eurasian jackdaw, Corvus monedula
- House crow, Corvus splendens
- Rook, Corvus frugilegus
- Carrion crow, Corvus corone
- Hooded crow, Corvus cornix
- Large-billed crow, Corvus macrorhynchos
- Brown-necked raven, Corvus ruficollis
- Common raven, Corvus corax

== Tits, chickadees, and titmice ==
Order: Passeriformes Family: Paridae

The Paridae are mainly small stocky woodland species with short stout bills. Some have crests. They are adaptable birds, with a mixed diet including seeds and insects.

- Coal tit, Periparus ater
- Sombre tit, Poecile lugubris
- Caspian tit, Poecile hyrcanus (E)
- Marsh tit, Poecile palustris
- Eurasian blue tit, Cyanistes caeruleus
- Azure tit, Cyanistes cyanus
- Yellow-breasted tit, Cyanistes flavipectus
- Great tit, Parus major
- Cinereous tit, Parus cinereus

== Penduline-tits ==
Order: Passeriformes Family: Remizidae

The penduline-tits are a group of small passerine birds related to the true tits. They are insectivores.

- Eurasian penduline-tit, Remiz pendulinus
- Black-headed penduline-tit, Remiz macronyx
- White-crowned penduline-tit, Remiz coronatus (A)

== Larks ==
Order: Passeriformes Family: Alaudidae

Larks are small terrestrial birds with often extravagant songs and display flights. Most larks are fairly dull in appearance. Their food is insects and seeds.

- Greater hoopoe-lark, Alaemon alaudipes
- Bar-tailed lark, Ammomanes cinctura
- Desert lark, Ammomanes deserti
- Black-crowned sparrow-lark, Eremopterix nigriceps
- Horned lark, Eremophila alpestris
- Greater short-toed lark, Calandrella brachydactyla
- Hume's lark, Calandrella acutirostris (A)
- Mongolian short-toed lark, Calandrella dukhunensis
- Bimaculated lark, Melanocorypha bimaculata
- Calandra lark, Melanocorypha calandra
- Black lark, Melanocorypha yeltoniensis (A)
- Asian short-toed lark, Alaudala cheleensis
- Turkestan short-toed lark, Alaudala heinei
- Sand lark, Alaudala raytal
- Turkestan short-toed lark, Alaudala heinei
- Wood lark, Lullula arborea
- White-winged lark, Alauda leucoptera (A)
- Eurasian skylark, Alauda arvensis
- Oriental skylark, Alauda gulgula
- Crested lark, Galerida cristata

== Bearded reedling ==
Order: Passeriformes Family: Panuridae

This species, the only one in its family, is found in reed beds throughout temperate Europe and Asia.

- Bearded reedling, Panurus biarmicus

== Cisticolas and allies ==
Order: Passeriformes Family: Cisticolidae

The Cisticolidae are warblers found mainly in warmer southern regions of the Old World. They are generally very small birds of drab brown or grey appearance found in open country such as grassland or scrub.

- Graceful prinia, Prinia gracilis
- Delicate prinia, Prinia lepida
- Zitting cisticola, Cisticola juncidis

== Reed warblers and allies ==
Order: Passeriformes Family: Acrocephalidae

The members of this family are usually rather large for "warblers". Most are rather plain olivaceous brown above with much yellow to beige below. They are usually found in open woodland, reedbeds, or tall grass. The family occurs mostly in southern to western Eurasia and surroundings, but it also ranges far into the Pacific, with some species in Africa.

- Booted warbler, Iduna caligata
- Sykes's warbler, Iduna rama
- Eastern olivaceous warbler, Iduna pallida
- Upcher's warbler, Hippolais languida
- Icterine warbler, Hippolais icterina
- Olive-tree warbler, Hippolais olivetorum
- Moustached warbler, Acrocephalus melanopogon
- Sedge warbler, Acrocephalus schoenobaenus
- Paddyfield warbler, Acrocephalus agricola (A)
- Blyth's reed warbler, Acrocephalus dumetorum (A)
- Marsh warbler, Acrocephalus palustris (A)
- Aquatic warbler, Acrocephalus paludicola
- Eurasian reed warbler, Acrocephalus scirpaceus
- Basra reed warbler, Acrocephalus griseldis
- Great reed warbler, Acrocephalus arundinaceus
- Clamorous reed warbler, Acrocephalus stentoreus

== Grassbirds and allies ==
Order: Passeriformes Family: Locustellidae

Locustellidae are a family of small insectivorous songbirds found mainly in Eurasia, Africa, and the Australian region. They are smallish birds with tails that are usually long and pointed, and tend to be drab brownish or buffy all over.

- River warbler, Locustella fluviatilis (A)
- Savi's warbler, Locustella luscinioides (A)
- Common grasshopper-warbler, Locustella naevia (A)

== Swallows ==
Order: Passeriformes Family: Hirundinidae

The family Hirundinidae is adapted to aerial feeding. They have a slender streamlined body, long pointed wings and a short bill with a wide gape. The feet are adapted to perching rather than walking, and the front toes are partially joined at the base.

- Gray-throated martin, Riparia chinensis (A)
- Brown-throated martin, Riparia paludicola
- Bank swallow, Riparia riparia
- Pale sand martin, Riparia diluta (A)
- Eurasian crag-martin, Ptyonoprogne rupestris
- Rock martin, Ptyonoprogne fuligula
- Pale crag-martin, Ptyonoprogne obsoleta
- Barn swallow, Hirundo rustica
- Wire-tailed swallow, Hirundo smithii (A)
- Red-rumped swallow, Cecropis daurica
- Streak-throated swallow, Petrochelidon fluvicola (A)
- Common house-martin, Delichon urbicum

== Bulbuls ==
Order: Passeriformes Family: Pycnonotidae

Bulbuls are medium-sized songbirds. Some are colourful with yellow, red or orange vents, cheeks, throats or supercilia, but most are drab, with uniform olive-brown to black plumage. Some species have distinct crests.

- Red-vented bulbul, Pycnonotus cafer (I)
- White-eared bulbul, Pycnonotus leucotis

== Leaf warblers ==
Order: Passeriformes Family: Phylloscopidae

Leaf warblers are a family of small insectivorous birds found mostly in Eurasia and ranging into Wallacea and Africa. The species are of various sizes, often green-plumaged above and yellow below, or more subdued with grayish-green to grayish-brown colors.

- Arctic warbler, Phylloscopus borealis
- Wood warbler, Phylloscopus sibilatrix (A)
- Eastern Bonelli's warbler, Phylloscopus orientalis (A)
- Yellow-browed warbler, Phylloscopus inornatus (A)
- Hume's warbler, Phylloscopus humei (A)
- Iberian chiffchaff, Phylloscopus ibericus
- Pallas's leaf warbler, Phylloscopus proregulus (A)
- Dusky warbler, Phylloscopus fuscatus (A)
- Plain leaf warbler, Phylloscopus neglectus
- Willow warbler, Phylloscopus trochilus
- Mountain chiffchaff, Phylloscopus sindianus
- Common chiffchaff, Phylloscopus collybita
- Green warbler, Phylloscopus nitidus
- Greenish warbler, Phylloscopus trochiloides (A)

== Bush warblers and allies ==
Order: Passeriformes Family: Scotocercidae

The members of this family are found throughout Africa, Asia, and Polynesia. Their taxonomy is in flux, and some authorities place some genera in other families.

- Scrub warbler, Scotocerca inquieta
- Cetti's warbler, Cettia cetti

== Long-tailed tits ==
Order: Passeriformes Family: Aegithalidae

Long-tailed tits are a group of small passerine birds with medium to long tails. They make woven bag nests in trees. Most eat a mixed diet which includes insects.

- Long-tailed tit, Aegithalos caudatus

== Sylviid warblers, parrotbills, and allies ==
Order: Passeriformes Family: Sylviidae

The family Sylviidae is a group of small insectivorous passerine birds. They mainly occur as breeding species, as the common name implies, in Europe, Asia and, to a lesser extent, Africa. Most are of generally undistinguished appearance, but many have distinctive songs.

- Eurasian blackcap, Sylvia atricapilla
- Garden warbler, Sylvia borin
- Asian desert warbler, Curruca nana
- Barred warbler, Curruca nisoria
- Lesser whitethroat, Curruca curruca
- Western Orphean warbler, Curruca hortensis
- Eastern Orphean warbler, Curruca crassirostris
- Sardinian warbler, Curruca melanocephala
- Menetries's warbler, Curruca mystacea
- Rüppell's warbler, Curruca ruppeli (A)
- Greater whitethroat, Curruca communis
- Spectacled warbler, Curruca conspicillata
- Desert whitethroat, Curruca minula
- Hume's whitethroat, Curruca althaea

== White-eyes, yuhinas, and allies ==
Order: Passeriformes Family: Zosteropidae

The white-eyes are small and mostly undistinguished, their plumage above being generally some dull color like greenish-olive, but some species have a white or bright yellow throat, breast, or lower parts, and several have buff flanks. As their name suggests, many species have a white ring around each eye.

- Indian white-eye, Zosterops palpebrosus

== Laughingthrushes and allies ==
Order: Passeriformes Family: Leiothrichidae

The members of this family are diverse in size and coloration, though those of genus Turdoides tend to be brown or grayish. The family is found in Africa, India, and southeast Asia.

- Iraq babbler, Argya altirostris
- Common babbler, Argya caudata
- Afghan babbler, Argya huttoni

== Kinglets ==
Order: Passeriformes Family: Regulidae

The kinglets, also called crests, are a small group of birds often included in the Old World warblers, but frequently given family status because they also resemble the titmice.

- Goldcrest, Regulus regulus

== Wallcreeper ==
Order: Passeriformes Family: Tichodromidae

The wallcreeper is a small bird related to the nuthatch family, which has stunning crimson, grey and black plumage.

- Wallcreeper, Tichodroma muraria

== Nuthatches ==
Order: Passeriformes Family: Sittidae

Nuthatches are small woodland birds. They have the unusual ability to climb down trees head first, unlike other birds which can only go upwards. Nuthatches have big heads, short tails and powerful bills and feet.

- Eurasian nuthatch, Sitta europaea
- Krüper's nuthatch, Sitta krueperi
- Western rock nuthatch, Sitta neumayer
- Eastern rock nuthatch, Sitta tephronota

== Treecreepers ==
Order: Passeriformes Family: Certhiidae

Treecreepers are small woodland birds, brown above and white below. They have thin pointed down-curved bills, which they use to extricate insects from bark. They have stiff tail feathers, like woodpeckers, which they use to support themselves on vertical trees.

- Eurasian treecreeper, Certhia familiaris
- Bar-tailed treecreeper, Certhia himalayana

== Wrens ==
Order: Passeriformes Family: Troglodytidae

The wrens are mainly small and inconspicuous except for their loud songs. These birds have short wings and thin down-turned bills. Several species often hold their tails upright. All are insectivorous.

- Eurasian wren, Troglodytes troglodytes

== Dippers ==
Order: Passeriformes Family: Cinclidae

Dippers are a group of perching birds whose habitat includes aquatic environments in the Americas, Europe and Asia. They are named for their bobbing or dipping movements.

- White-throated dipper, Cinclus cinclus

== Starlings ==
Order: Passeriformes Family: Sturnidae

Starlings are small to medium-sized passerine birds. Their flight is strong and direct and they are very gregarious. Their preferred habitat is fairly open country. They eat insects and fruit. Plumage is typically dark with a metallic sheen.

- European starling, Sturnus vulgaris
- Rosy starling, Pastor roseus (A)
- Brahminy starling, Sturnia pagodarum
- Chestnut-tailed starling, Sturnia malabarica (A)
- Common myna, Acridotheres tristis
- Bank myna, Acridotheres ginginianus
- Somali starling, Onychognathus blythii (A)

== Thrushes and allies ==
Order: Passeriformes Family: Turdidae

The thrushes are a group of passerine birds that occur mainly in the Old World. They are plump, soft plumaged, small to medium-sized insectivores or sometimes omnivores, often feeding on the ground. Many have attractive songs.

- Mistle thrush, Turdus viscivorus
- Song thrush, Turdus philomelos
- Redwing, Turdus iliacus
- Eurasian blackbird, Turdus merula
- Fieldfare, Turdus pilaris
- Ring ouzel, Turdus torquatus
- Black-throated thrush, Turdus atrogularis
- Red-throated thrush, Turdus ruficollis (A)
- Dusky thrush, Turdus eunomus (A)

== Old World flycatchers ==
Order: Passeriformes Family: Muscicapidae

Old World flycatchers are a large group of small passerine birds native to the Old World. They are mainly small arboreal insectivores. The appearance of these birds is highly varied, but they mostly have weak songs and harsh calls.

- Spotted flycatcher, Muscicapa striata
- Asian brown flycatcher, Muscicapa dauurica
- Rufous-tailed scrub-robin, Cercotrichas galactotes
- Verditer flycatcher, Eumyias thalassinus (A)
- European robin, Erithacus rubecula
- White-throated robin, Irania gutturalis
- Thrush nightingale, Luscinia luscinia
- Common nightingale, Luscinia megarhynchos
- Bluethroat, Luscinia svecica
- Blue whistling-thrush, Myophonus caeruleus(A)
- Ultramarine flycatcher, Ficedula superciliaris (A)
- Taiga flycatcher, Ficedula albicilla (A)
- Collared flycatcher, Ficedula albicollis
- Red-breasted flycatcher, Ficedula parva
- Semicollared flycatcher, Ficedula semitorquata
- European pied flycatcher, Ficedula hypoleuca (A)
- Güldenstädt's redstart, Phoenicurus erythrogastrus
- Rufous-backed redstart, Phoenicurus erythronotus
- Plumbeous redstart, Phoenicurus fuliginosus
- Common redstart, Phoenicurus phoenicurus
- Black redstart, Phoenicurus ochruros
- Rufous-tailed rock-thrush, Monticola saxatilis
- Blue rock-thrush, Monticola solitarius
- Black redstart, Phoenicurus ochruros
- Common redstart, Phoenicurus phoenicurus
- Whinchat, Saxicola rubetra
- European stonechat, Saxicola rubicola (A)
- Siberian stonechat, Saxicola maurus
- Pied bushchat, Saxicola caprata
- Northern wheatear, Oenanthe oenanthe
- Isabelline wheatear, Oenanthe isabellina
- Hooded wheatear, Oenanthe monacha
- Desert wheatear, Oenanthe deserti
- Pied wheatear, Oenanthe pleschanka
- Eastern black-eared wheatear, Oenanthe melanoleuca
- Variable wheatear, Oenanthe picata
- Hume's wheatear, Oenanthe albonigra
- White-crowned wheatear, Oenanthe leucopyga (A)
- Finsch's wheatear, Oenanthe finschii
- Mourning wheatear, Oenanthe lugens
- Kurdish wheatear, Oenanthe xanthoprymna
- Persian wheatear, Oenanthe chrysopygia
- Eastern black-eared wheatear, Oenanthe melanoleuca
- Rufous-bellied niltava, Niltava sundara

== Waxwings ==
Order: Passeriformes Family: Bombycillidae

The waxwings are a group of birds with soft silky plumage and unique red tips to some of the wing feathers. In the Bohemian and cedar waxwings, these tips look like sealing wax and give the group its name. These are arboreal birds of northern forests. They live on insects in summer and berries in winter.

- Bohemian waxwing, Bombycilla garrulus (A)

== Hypocolius ==
Order: Passeriformes Family: Hypocoliidae

The grey hypocolius is a small Middle Eastern bird with the shape and soft plumage of a waxwing. They are mainly a uniform grey colour except the males have a black triangular mask around their eyes.

- Hypocolius, Hypocolius ampelinus

== Sunbirds and spiderhunters ==
Order: Passeriformes Family: Nectariniidae

The sunbirds and spiderhunters are very small passerine birds which feed largely on nectar, although they will also take insects, especially when feeding young. Flight is fast and direct on their short wings. Most species can take nectar by hovering like a hummingbird, but usually perch to feed.

- Purple sunbird, Cinnyris asiaticus
- Shining sunbird, Cinnyris habessinicus

== Waxbills and allies ==
Order: Passeriformes Family: Estrildidae

The estrildid finches are small passerine birds of the Old World tropics and Australasia. They are gregarious and often colonial seed eaters with short thick but pointed bills. They are all similar in structure and habits, but have wide variation in plumage colours and patterns.

- Red avadavat, Amandava amandava (A)
- Indian silverbill, Euodice malabarica
- Scaly-breasted munia, Lonchura punctulata
- Zebra finch, Taeniopygia guttata

== Weavers and allies ==
- Black-breasted weaver, Ploceus benghalensis
- Red fody, Foudia madagascariensis

== Accentors ==
Order: Passeriformes Family: Prunellidae

The accentors are in the only bird family, Prunellidae, which is completely endemic to the Palearctic. They are small, fairly drab species superficially similar to sparrows.

- Alpine accentor, Prunella collaris
- Radde's accentor, Prunella ocularis
- Black-throated accentor, Prunella atrogularis (A)
- Dunnock, Prunella modularis

== Old World sparrows ==
Order: Passeriformes Family: Passeridae

Old World sparrows are small passerine birds. In general, sparrows tend to be small, plump, brown or grey birds with short tails and short powerful beaks. Sparrows are seed eaters, but they also consume small insects.

- Saxaul sparrow, Passer ammodendri (A)
- House sparrow, Passer domesticus
- Spanish sparrow, Passer hispaniolensis
- Sind sparrow, Passer pyrrhonotus (A)
- Dead Sea sparrow, Passer moabiticus
- Zarudny's sparrow, Passer zarudnyi (A)
- Eurasian tree sparrow, Passer montanus
- Yellow-throated sparrow, Gymnoris xanthocollis
- Rock sparrow, Petronia petronia
- Pale rockfinch, Carpospiza brachydactyla
- White-winged snowfinch, Montifringilla nivalis

== Wagtails and pipits ==
Order: Passeriformes Family: Motacillidae

Motacillidae is a family of small passerine birds with medium to long tails. They include the wagtails, longclaws and pipits. They are slender, ground feeding insectivores of open country.

- Forest wagtail, Dendronanthus indicus (A)
- Gray wagtail, Motacilla cinerea
- Western yellow wagtail, Motacilla flava
- Citrine wagtail, Motacilla citreola
- White wagtail, Motacilla alba
- Richard's pipit, Anthus richardi (A)
- Paddyfield pipit, Anthus rufulus (A)
- Long-billed pipit, Anthus similis
- Tawny pipit, Anthus campestris
- Meadow pipit, Anthus pratensis
- Tree pipit, Anthus trivialis
- Olive-backed pipit, Anthus hodgsoni (A)
- Red-throated pipit, Anthus cervinus
- Water pipit, Anthus spinoletta
- American pipit, Anthus rubescens (A)
- African pipit, Anthus cinnamomeus

== Finches, euphonias, and allies ==
Order: Passeriformes Family: Fringillidae

Finches are seed-eating passerine birds, that are small to moderately large and have a strong beak, usually conical and in some species very large. All have twelve tail feathers and nine primaries. These birds have a bouncing flight with alternating bouts of flapping and gliding on closed wings, and most sing well.

- Common chaffinch, Fringilla coelebs
- Brambling, Fringilla montifringilla
- White-winged grosbeak, Mycerobas carnipes
- Black-and-yellow grosbeak, Mycerobas icterioides
- Hawfinch, Coccothraustes coccothraustes
- Common rosefinch, Carpodacus erythrinus
- Red-mantled rosefinch, Carpodacus rhodochlamys
- Great rosefinch, Carpodacus rubicilla
- Eurasian bullfinch, Pyrrhula pyrrhula (A)
- Crimson-winged finch, Rhodopechys sanguineus
- Trumpeter finch, Bucanetes githagineus
- Mongolian finch, Bucanetes mongolicus
- Desert finch, Rhodospiza obsoleta
- European greenfinch, Chloris chloris
- Yellow-breasted greenfinch, Chloris spinoides
- Twite, Carduelis flavirostris
- Eurasian linnet, Carduelis cannabina
- Red crossbill, Loxia curvirostra (A)
- European goldfinch, Carduelis carduelis
- European serin, Serinus serinus (A)
- Fire-fronted serin, Serinus pusillus
- Eurasian siskin, Spinus spinus

== Longspurs and snow buntings ==
Order: Passeriformes Family: Calcariidae

The Calcariidae are a family of birds that had been traditionally grouped with the New World sparrows, but differ in a number of respects and are usually found in open grassy areas.

- Lapland longspur, Calcarius lapponicus (A)

== Old World buntings ==
Order: Passeriformes Family: Emberizidae

The emberizids are a large family of passerine birds. They are seed-eating birds with distinctively shaped bills. Many emberizid species have distinctive head patterns.

- Black-headed bunting, Emberiza melanocephala
- Red-headed bunting, Emberiza bruniceps
- Corn bunting, Emberiza calandra
- Rock bunting, Emberiza cia
- Cirl bunting, Emberiza cirlus
- White-capped bunting, Emberiza stewarti (A)
- Yellowhammer, Emberiza citrinella
- Pine bunting, Emberiza leucocephalos
- Gray-necked bunting, Emberiza buchanani
- Cinereous bunting, Emberiza cineracea (A)
- Ortolan bunting, Emberiza hortulana
- Cretzschmar's bunting, Emberiza caesia (A)
- Striolated bunting, Emberiza striolata
- Reed bunting, Emberiza schoeniclus
- Yellow-breasted bunting, Emberiza aureola (A)
- Little bunting, Emberiza pusilla (A)
- Rustic bunting, Emberiza rustica (A)

== See also ==
- List of birds
- Lists of birds by region
- Wildlife of Iran
