= Strain (biology) =

Genetic variant, subtype or culture within a biological species

In biology, a strain is a genetic variant, a subtype or a culture within a biological species. Strains are often seen as inherently artificial concepts, characterized by a specific intent for genetic isolation. This is most easily observed in microbiology where strains are derived from a single cell colony and are typically quarantined by the physical constraints of a Petri dish. Strains are also commonly referred to within virology, botany, and with rodents used in experimental studies.

== Prokaryotes ==
Prokaryotes (bacteria and archaea) have a vertical pattern of inheritance, with the exception of horizontal gene transfer events. The concept of a strain is traditionally based on cell culture lineage: the Prokaryotic Code defines a strain as the group "of the descendants of a single isolation in pure culture". Accordingly, prokaryotes in the same strain are expected to have minimal phenotypic and genetic differences. (There has been some complication in the case of lost records about culture lineages.) A strain can be identified by a name assigned by some author (e.g. "B6", "natto"), or by the abbreviation of a culture collection followed by a number (e.g. ATCC 23308).

The above fits well for artificial strains, often constructed in labs via mutagenesis followed by selection, or through more direct genetic modification. In biotechnology, microbial strains have been constructed to establish metabolic pathways suitable for treating a variety of applications. Historically, a major effort of metabolic research has been devoted to the field of biofuel production. Escherichia coli is most common species for prokaryotic strain engineering. Scientists have succeeded in establishing viable minimal genomes from which new strains can be developed. These minimal strains provide a near guarantee that experiments on genes outside the minimal framework will not be effected by non-essential pathways. Optimized strains of E. coli are typically used for this application. E. coli are also often used as a chassis for the expression of simple proteins. These strains, such as BL21, are genetically modified to minimize protease activity, hence enabling potential for high efficiency industrial scale protein production.

=== Natural strain ===
The concept of a strain has also been expanded ad hoc to natural, uncultured populations such as those identified by metagenomics. However, this kind of use reveals an issue in the traditional definition of a strain: when a bacterium is transferred from a wild environment to culture, it often exhibits phenotypic changes due to adaptation, yet the wild and lab versions are not usually considered separate strains.

An objective definition of a strain, independent from records and only based on the genome, has been proposed to solve the problem of lost records and natural/lab phenotype change. Rodriguez et al. (2024) found that the average nucleotide identity (ANI) between microbe genome pairs have a natural gap at 99.2%–99.8%, in addition to the previously known 95% species-level gap. They further found that using the ANI cutoffs of 99.5% or 99.8% both produce "strain" assignments that agree well with historical assignments.

== Fungi ==
Fungi and plants are both governed by the Botanical Code. As a result, the term "strain" has no official taxonomic meaning. In common usage, the concept of a "strain" is similar to the prokaryotic one (descendants of a single isolation in pure culture). The practice of naming is also similar to the prokaryotic case (e.g. "PC-3-7" = "NRRL 15500").

Strains of yeasts are the most common subjects of eukaryotic genetic modification, especially with respect to industrial fermentation.

== Virology ==
With the exception of recombination events, viruses have a vertical pattern of inheritance, making for an obvious borrowing of the strain concept from microbiology. However, significant divergence has since happened: it has been said that "there is no universally accepted definition for the terms 'strain', 'variant', and 'isolate' in the virology community, and most virologists simply copy the usage of terms from others".

=== Particular taxa ===
Some particular groups of viruses have a clear definition of a "strain".

==== Filoviridae ====
A 2012-2013 standardized nomenclature for Filoviridae defines the terms thusly:

- Strains of viruses belong to the same species. They are distinguished from each other by unique phenotypic characteristics that remain stable under natural conditions. A laboratory strain (lab strain) is created when a strain, originally unable to cause disease in some animal, becomes able to do so by serial passage.
- (Genetic) variants or mutants belong to the same strain. It includes one or multiple isolates with a "slight" genomic, symptomatic, or mode-of-transmission difference from the reference (type) for the strain. A lab variant is derived from a mutant by serial passage. It needs to have mutations compared to the ancestor, but also needs to be no more than 10% genetically different.
- An isolate is simply an instance of a particular virus. It may or may not have been cultured in a lab. A lab isolate is an instance of a lab strain or lab variant.

A Filoviridae isolate may be referred to in three ways:

- Full length, virus name strain/isolation host-suffix/country of sampling/year of sampling/genetic variant designation-isolate designation. Example: "Ebola virus/H. sapiens-tc/COD/1995/Kikwit-9510621".
- Shorthand, virus name abbreviation strain/isolation host-suffix/country of sampling/year of sampling/genetic variant designation-isolate designation. Example: "EBOV/Hsap/COD/95/Kik-9510621".
- Abbreviation, virus abbreviation[/genetic variant designation[-isolate designation]]. Examples: "EBOV/Kik-9510621", "EBOV/Kik", "EBOV".

==== Orthomyxoviridae ====
The Orthomyxoviridae (flu viruses) have a standard strain nomenclature by the WHO. An example is "A/chicken/Nakorn-Patom/Thailand/CU-K2/04(H5N1)". See Influenza § Influenza virus nomenclature.

The WHO nomenclature does not define the term strain. Throughout the document it has a meaning similar to "isolate".

=== Artificial viral constructs ===
Scientists have modified isolates of viruses in order to study their behavior, as in the case of the H5N1 influenza virus. While funding for such research has aroused controversy at times due to safety concerns, leading to a temporary pause, it has subsequently proceeded.

The live attenuated influenza vaccine is made by swapping the surface antigen genes (HA, NA) of a human flu isolate into a non-human flu isolate that replicates poorly at human body temperature. The resulting virus still replicates poorly in humans like its non-human parent. However, the surface antigen it carries will teach the recipient's immune system about the corresponding human flu isolate.

== Plants ==
The term has no official ranking status in botany; the term refers to the collective descendants produced from a common ancestor that share a uniform morphological or physiological character. A strain is a designated group of offspring that are either descended from a modified plant (produced by conventional breeding or by biotechnological means), or which result from genetic mutation.

As an example, some rice strains are made by inserting new genetic material into a rice plant, all the descendants of the genetically modified rice plant are a strain with unique genetic information that is passed on to later generations; the strain designation, which is normally a number or a formal name, covers all the plants that descend from the originally modified plant. The rice plants in the strain can be bred to other rice strains or cultivars, and if desirable plants are produced, these are further bred to stabilize the desirable traits; the stabilized plants that can be propagated and "come true" (remain identical to the parent plant) are given a cultivar name and released into production to be used by farmers.

== Rodents ==
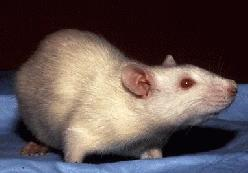
The Wistar rat, which was the first developed rat model strain

A laboratory mouse or rat strain is a group of animals that is genetically uniform. Strains are used in laboratory experiments. Mouse strains can be inbred, mutated, or genetically modified, while rat strains are usually inbred. A given inbred rodent population is considered genetically identical after 20 generations of sibling-mating. Many rodent strains have been developed for a variety of disease models, and they are also often used to test drug toxicity.

== Insects ==
The common fruit fly (Drosophila melanogaster) was among the first organisms used for genetic analysis, has a simple genome, and is very well understood. It has remained a popular model organism for many other reasons, like the ease of its breeding and maintenance, and the speed and volume of its reproduction. Various specific strains have been developed, including a flightless version with stunted wings (also used in the pet trade as live food for small reptiles and amphibians).

== See also ==
- Genetic isolate
- Clone (cell biology)
- Race (taxonomy)
- Variant (biology)
- Fish stocks
