= High Governorate of Maimana =

Former province of Afghanistan

Meymaneh Province
- Province of Afghanistan
- 1921–1964
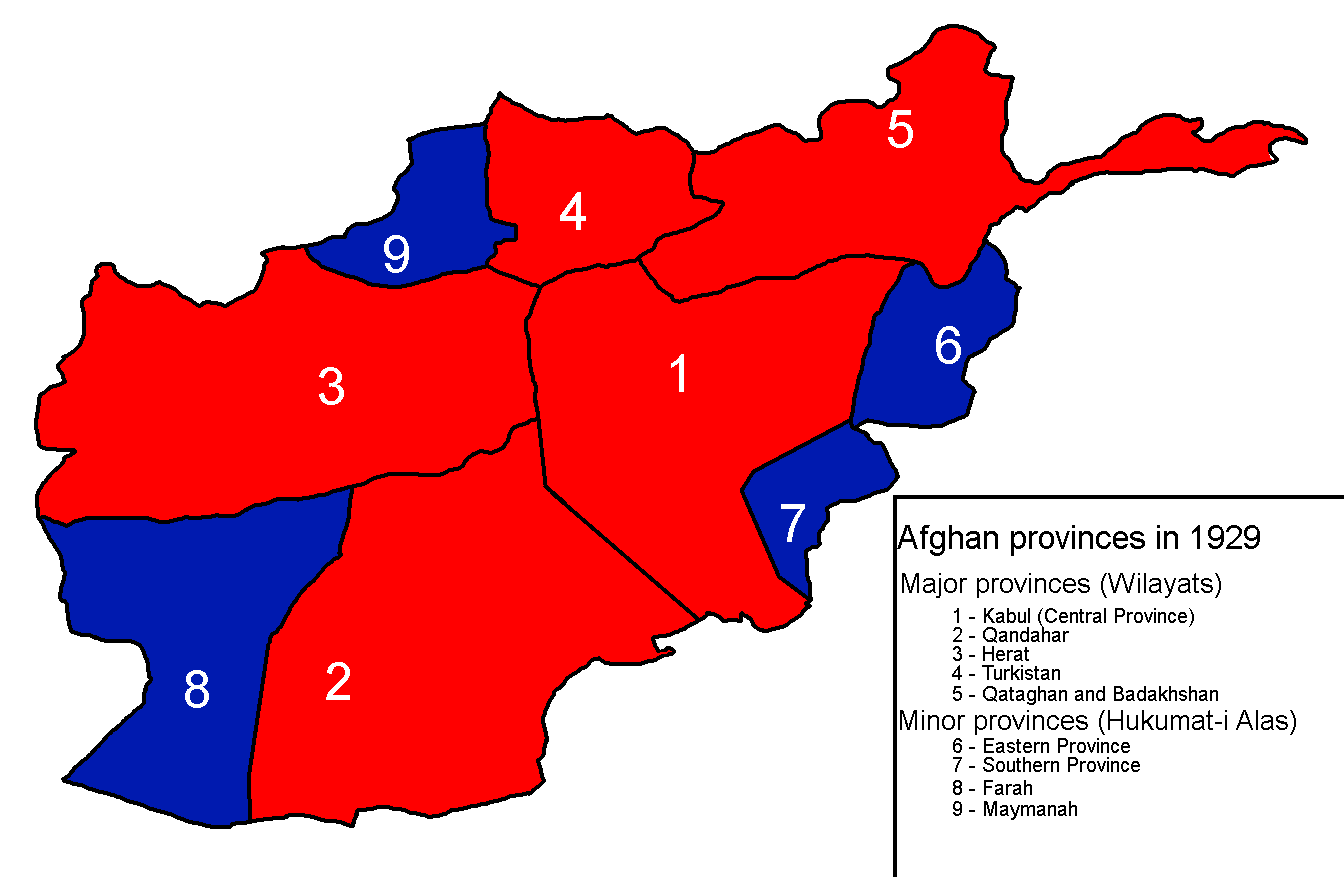
- Maimana (#9) in 1929
- Government
  - Type: Province
- History
  - Established: 1921
  - Disestablished: 1964
Succeeded by
Badghis Province; Faryab Province
- Today part of: Afghanistan

Meymaneh Province was a former province of Afghanistan, which in 1964 was divided, creating Badghis Province and Faryab Province. However, the name "Maymana" survives the administrative center of the Faryab Province.

== Sources ==
- Statoids.com - Provinces of Afghanistan
