= Wolfgang Frey =

German bryologist and phytogeographer

Wolfgang Frey (born 14 August 1942 in Rechberghausen) is a German bryologist and phytogeographer.

In 2007, a Festschrift was published in honor of Frey.
