= Flora Iranica =

1963–2015 books about Iranian highland flora

- Edited by: Karl Heinz Rechinger
- Original title: Flora des Iranischen Hochlandes und der umrahmenden Gebirge: Persien, Afghanistan, Teile von West-Pakistan, Nord-Iraq, Azerbaidjan, Turkmenistan
- Country: Austria
- Language: Latin, German/English
- Publisher: Graz: Akademische Druck- u. Verlagsanstalt
- Published: 1963 – 2015
- No. of books: 181
- Website: https://www.nhm-wien.ac.at/en/publications/scientific_series/flora_iranica

Flora Iranica is a series of books on the flora of Iranian highlands and adjacent mountains in Iran, Afghanistan, Pakistan, Iraq, Azerbaijan and Turkmenistan. The general editor of the series was the Austrian botanist Karl Heinz Rechinger (1963 - 1998).

It included genera from plants such as the genus Ferula (53 species) within the Apiaceae family, the genus Cousinia (353 species) within the Asteraceae, 126 genera within the Brassicaceae, the genera Astragalus (with approx. more than 1000 species) within the Fabaceae, the genus Nepeta (59 species) within the Lamiaceae and the genus Acantholimon (164 species) within the Plumbaginaceae family.

From 1963 up to 2005, 176 fascicles of Flora Iranica were published holding details about 9977 species and 1471 genera. A total number of 3318 species were mentioned as endemic to the Flora Iranica area (33%) and this included 1490 species which are known as endemic to Iran (24%). Up to 97 botanist from 20 different countries have contributed to Flora Iranica, which includes 10065 pages of text and 5873 pages of high quality black/white tabulae (pictures) of herbarium specimens and also 204 colour illustrations of 397 pictures.

== Bibliography ==
- Podlech, Dieter (1996). "Karl Heinz Rechinger und die Flora Iranica". Annalen des Naturhistorischen Museums in Wien 98 B Suppl., pp. 57-65.
- Frey, Wolfgang (1999). "Flora Iranica." In: Encyclopædia Iranica, vol. X,1, p. 63 (updated version from 2012 online).
