= Variant (biology) =

Subtype of a microorganism

In microbiology and virology, the term variant or genetic variant is used to describe a subtype of a microorganism that is genetically distinct from a main strain, but not sufficiently different to be termed a distinct strain. A similar distinction is made in botany between different cultivated varieties of a species of plant, termed cultivars.

== Viruses ==
=== SARS-CoV-2 ===
It was said in 2013 that "there is no universally accepted definition for the terms 'strain', 'variant', and 'isolate' in the virology community, and most virologists simply copy the usage of terms from others". The lack of precise definition continued in 2020; in the context of the Variant of Concern 202012/01 version of the SARS-CoV-2 virus, the website of the US Centers for Disease Control and Prevention (CDC) states, "For the time being in the context of this variant, the [terms "variant", "strain", and "lineage"] are generally being used interchangeably by the scientific community".
